

324001–324100 

|-bgcolor=#E9E9E9
| 324001 ||  || — || October 24, 2005 || Palomar || NEAT || — || align=right | 2.3 km || 
|-id=002 bgcolor=#E9E9E9
| 324002 ||  || — || October 26, 2005 || Kitt Peak || Spacewatch || — || align=right | 2.4 km || 
|-id=003 bgcolor=#E9E9E9
| 324003 ||  || — || October 26, 2005 || Kitt Peak || Spacewatch || — || align=right | 2.5 km || 
|-id=004 bgcolor=#E9E9E9
| 324004 ||  || — || October 26, 2005 || Kitt Peak || Spacewatch || WIT || align=right | 1.1 km || 
|-id=005 bgcolor=#E9E9E9
| 324005 ||  || — || October 26, 2005 || Kitt Peak || Spacewatch || — || align=right | 2.3 km || 
|-id=006 bgcolor=#E9E9E9
| 324006 ||  || — || October 26, 2005 || Kitt Peak || Spacewatch || — || align=right | 3.1 km || 
|-id=007 bgcolor=#E9E9E9
| 324007 ||  || — || October 26, 2005 || Kitt Peak || Spacewatch || — || align=right | 2.3 km || 
|-id=008 bgcolor=#E9E9E9
| 324008 ||  || — || October 26, 2005 || Kitt Peak || Spacewatch || — || align=right | 5.4 km || 
|-id=009 bgcolor=#d6d6d6
| 324009 ||  || — || October 26, 2005 || Kitt Peak || Spacewatch || — || align=right | 2.1 km || 
|-id=010 bgcolor=#E9E9E9
| 324010 ||  || — || October 28, 2005 || Mount Lemmon || Mount Lemmon Survey || — || align=right | 2.0 km || 
|-id=011 bgcolor=#E9E9E9
| 324011 ||  || — || October 28, 2005 || Mount Lemmon || Mount Lemmon Survey || — || align=right | 3.2 km || 
|-id=012 bgcolor=#E9E9E9
| 324012 ||  || — || October 29, 2005 || Catalina || CSS || ADE || align=right | 2.2 km || 
|-id=013 bgcolor=#E9E9E9
| 324013 ||  || — || October 27, 2005 || Socorro || LINEAR || — || align=right | 2.2 km || 
|-id=014 bgcolor=#E9E9E9
| 324014 ||  || — || October 29, 2005 || Mount Lemmon || Mount Lemmon Survey || GEF || align=right | 1.3 km || 
|-id=015 bgcolor=#d6d6d6
| 324015 ||  || — || October 28, 2005 || Mount Lemmon || Mount Lemmon Survey || KOR || align=right | 1.5 km || 
|-id=016 bgcolor=#E9E9E9
| 324016 ||  || — || October 23, 2005 || Palomar || NEAT || MAR || align=right | 1.9 km || 
|-id=017 bgcolor=#E9E9E9
| 324017 ||  || — || October 27, 2005 || Socorro || LINEAR || — || align=right | 2.9 km || 
|-id=018 bgcolor=#E9E9E9
| 324018 ||  || — || October 29, 2005 || Catalina || CSS || ADE || align=right | 2.6 km || 
|-id=019 bgcolor=#d6d6d6
| 324019 ||  || — || October 27, 2005 || Kitt Peak || Spacewatch || KAR || align=right | 1.2 km || 
|-id=020 bgcolor=#d6d6d6
| 324020 ||  || — || October 27, 2005 || Kitt Peak || Spacewatch || — || align=right | 2.7 km || 
|-id=021 bgcolor=#E9E9E9
| 324021 ||  || — || October 28, 2005 || Mount Lemmon || Mount Lemmon Survey || NEM || align=right | 2.1 km || 
|-id=022 bgcolor=#E9E9E9
| 324022 ||  || — || October 29, 2005 || Mount Lemmon || Mount Lemmon Survey || — || align=right | 2.2 km || 
|-id=023 bgcolor=#E9E9E9
| 324023 ||  || — || October 27, 2005 || Kitt Peak || Spacewatch || — || align=right | 1.7 km || 
|-id=024 bgcolor=#E9E9E9
| 324024 ||  || — || October 29, 2005 || Mount Lemmon || Mount Lemmon Survey || — || align=right | 2.5 km || 
|-id=025 bgcolor=#d6d6d6
| 324025 ||  || — || October 27, 2005 || Mount Lemmon || Mount Lemmon Survey || KOR || align=right | 1.5 km || 
|-id=026 bgcolor=#d6d6d6
| 324026 ||  || — || October 29, 2005 || Mount Lemmon || Mount Lemmon Survey || THM || align=right | 1.9 km || 
|-id=027 bgcolor=#d6d6d6
| 324027 ||  || — || October 25, 2005 || Kitt Peak || Spacewatch || KOR || align=right | 1.3 km || 
|-id=028 bgcolor=#E9E9E9
| 324028 ||  || — || October 27, 2005 || Mount Lemmon || Mount Lemmon Survey || — || align=right | 3.3 km || 
|-id=029 bgcolor=#E9E9E9
| 324029 ||  || — || October 28, 2005 || Mount Lemmon || Mount Lemmon Survey || EUN || align=right data-sort-value="0.91" | 910 m || 
|-id=030 bgcolor=#d6d6d6
| 324030 ||  || — || October 28, 2005 || Kitt Peak || Spacewatch || KOR || align=right | 1.4 km || 
|-id=031 bgcolor=#E9E9E9
| 324031 ||  || — || October 31, 2005 || Kitt Peak || Spacewatch || WIT || align=right | 1.2 km || 
|-id=032 bgcolor=#E9E9E9
| 324032 ||  || — || October 28, 2005 || Socorro || LINEAR || — || align=right | 2.5 km || 
|-id=033 bgcolor=#E9E9E9
| 324033 ||  || — || October 29, 2005 || Catalina || CSS || — || align=right | 2.9 km || 
|-id=034 bgcolor=#E9E9E9
| 324034 ||  || — || October 29, 2005 || Catalina || CSS || MRX || align=right | 1.2 km || 
|-id=035 bgcolor=#E9E9E9
| 324035 ||  || — || October 30, 2005 || Kitt Peak || Spacewatch || — || align=right | 2.5 km || 
|-id=036 bgcolor=#E9E9E9
| 324036 ||  || — || October 29, 2005 || Catalina || CSS || — || align=right | 2.4 km || 
|-id=037 bgcolor=#E9E9E9
| 324037 ||  || — || October 29, 2005 || Catalina || CSS || — || align=right | 2.9 km || 
|-id=038 bgcolor=#E9E9E9
| 324038 ||  || — || October 29, 2005 || Mount Lemmon || Mount Lemmon Survey || HOF || align=right | 2.5 km || 
|-id=039 bgcolor=#fefefe
| 324039 ||  || — || October 30, 2005 || Catalina || CSS || H || align=right data-sort-value="0.79" | 790 m || 
|-id=040 bgcolor=#E9E9E9
| 324040 ||  || — || October 20, 2005 || Palomar || NEAT || — || align=right | 2.9 km || 
|-id=041 bgcolor=#E9E9E9
| 324041 ||  || — || October 26, 2005 || Anderson Mesa || LONEOS || ADE || align=right | 2.9 km || 
|-id=042 bgcolor=#E9E9E9
| 324042 ||  || — || October 26, 2005 || Anderson Mesa || LONEOS || — || align=right | 3.3 km || 
|-id=043 bgcolor=#d6d6d6
| 324043 ||  || — || October 28, 2005 || Mount Lemmon || Mount Lemmon Survey || — || align=right | 1.9 km || 
|-id=044 bgcolor=#E9E9E9
| 324044 ||  || — || October 25, 2005 || Apache Point || A. C. Becker || — || align=right | 1.4 km || 
|-id=045 bgcolor=#E9E9E9
| 324045 ||  || — || October 25, 2005 || Kitt Peak || Spacewatch || AGN || align=right | 1.5 km || 
|-id=046 bgcolor=#E9E9E9
| 324046 ||  || — || October 27, 2005 || Mount Lemmon || Mount Lemmon Survey || — || align=right | 3.3 km || 
|-id=047 bgcolor=#fefefe
| 324047 ||  || — || November 3, 2005 || Socorro || LINEAR || H || align=right data-sort-value="0.79" | 790 m || 
|-id=048 bgcolor=#d6d6d6
| 324048 ||  || — || November 1, 2005 || Kitt Peak || Spacewatch || BRA || align=right | 1.9 km || 
|-id=049 bgcolor=#E9E9E9
| 324049 ||  || — || November 3, 2005 || Kitt Peak || Spacewatch || — || align=right | 2.3 km || 
|-id=050 bgcolor=#E9E9E9
| 324050 ||  || — || November 4, 2005 || Kitt Peak || Spacewatch || AGN || align=right | 1.1 km || 
|-id=051 bgcolor=#d6d6d6
| 324051 ||  || — || November 4, 2005 || Kitt Peak || Spacewatch || KOR || align=right | 1.6 km || 
|-id=052 bgcolor=#E9E9E9
| 324052 ||  || — || November 4, 2005 || Kitt Peak || Spacewatch || HOF || align=right | 3.4 km || 
|-id=053 bgcolor=#E9E9E9
| 324053 ||  || — || November 4, 2005 || Catalina || CSS || NEM || align=right | 2.7 km || 
|-id=054 bgcolor=#E9E9E9
| 324054 ||  || — || November 3, 2005 || Mount Lemmon || Mount Lemmon Survey || MRX || align=right | 1.3 km || 
|-id=055 bgcolor=#d6d6d6
| 324055 ||  || — || October 25, 2005 || Kitt Peak || Spacewatch || — || align=right | 2.3 km || 
|-id=056 bgcolor=#E9E9E9
| 324056 ||  || — || November 4, 2005 || Kitt Peak || Spacewatch || MAR || align=right | 1.5 km || 
|-id=057 bgcolor=#E9E9E9
| 324057 ||  || — || November 5, 2005 || Kitt Peak || Spacewatch || — || align=right | 2.3 km || 
|-id=058 bgcolor=#E9E9E9
| 324058 ||  || — || November 5, 2005 || Kitt Peak || Spacewatch || HNS || align=right | 1.6 km || 
|-id=059 bgcolor=#E9E9E9
| 324059 ||  || — || November 5, 2005 || Kitt Peak || Spacewatch || — || align=right | 2.0 km || 
|-id=060 bgcolor=#E9E9E9
| 324060 ||  || — || November 5, 2005 || Catalina || CSS || — || align=right | 1.9 km || 
|-id=061 bgcolor=#fefefe
| 324061 ||  || — || November 5, 2005 || Catalina || CSS || H || align=right data-sort-value="0.96" | 960 m || 
|-id=062 bgcolor=#E9E9E9
| 324062 ||  || — || November 1, 2005 || Mount Lemmon || Mount Lemmon Survey || PAD || align=right | 1.8 km || 
|-id=063 bgcolor=#E9E9E9
| 324063 ||  || — || November 1, 2005 || Mount Lemmon || Mount Lemmon Survey || EUN || align=right | 1.3 km || 
|-id=064 bgcolor=#d6d6d6
| 324064 ||  || — || November 6, 2005 || Kitt Peak || Spacewatch || — || align=right | 2.8 km || 
|-id=065 bgcolor=#E9E9E9
| 324065 ||  || — || November 6, 2005 || Kitt Peak || Spacewatch || — || align=right | 2.9 km || 
|-id=066 bgcolor=#E9E9E9
| 324066 ||  || — || November 5, 2005 || Kitt Peak || Spacewatch || — || align=right | 2.3 km || 
|-id=067 bgcolor=#E9E9E9
| 324067 ||  || — || November 5, 2005 || Kitt Peak || Spacewatch || HOF || align=right | 3.0 km || 
|-id=068 bgcolor=#E9E9E9
| 324068 ||  || — || November 12, 2005 || Kitt Peak || Spacewatch || — || align=right | 2.6 km || 
|-id=069 bgcolor=#d6d6d6
| 324069 ||  || — || November 5, 2005 || Catalina || CSS || — || align=right | 4.1 km || 
|-id=070 bgcolor=#d6d6d6
| 324070 ||  || — || November 21, 2005 || Socorro || LINEAR || Tj (2.99) || align=right | 3.8 km || 
|-id=071 bgcolor=#d6d6d6
| 324071 ||  || — || October 30, 2005 || Mount Lemmon || Mount Lemmon Survey || — || align=right | 2.9 km || 
|-id=072 bgcolor=#d6d6d6
| 324072 ||  || — || November 21, 2005 || Kitt Peak || Spacewatch || — || align=right | 2.4 km || 
|-id=073 bgcolor=#E9E9E9
| 324073 ||  || — || November 21, 2005 || Kitt Peak || Spacewatch || — || align=right | 2.4 km || 
|-id=074 bgcolor=#E9E9E9
| 324074 ||  || — || November 21, 2005 || Kitt Peak || Spacewatch || MRX || align=right | 1.4 km || 
|-id=075 bgcolor=#d6d6d6
| 324075 ||  || — || November 21, 2005 || Kitt Peak || Spacewatch || EOS || align=right | 2.9 km || 
|-id=076 bgcolor=#d6d6d6
| 324076 ||  || — || November 25, 2005 || Mount Lemmon || Mount Lemmon Survey || KOR || align=right | 1.3 km || 
|-id=077 bgcolor=#d6d6d6
| 324077 ||  || — || November 30, 2005 || Socorro || LINEAR || — || align=right | 4.2 km || 
|-id=078 bgcolor=#E9E9E9
| 324078 ||  || — || November 22, 2005 || Kitt Peak || Spacewatch || HEN || align=right | 1.4 km || 
|-id=079 bgcolor=#E9E9E9
| 324079 ||  || — || November 25, 2005 || Kitt Peak || Spacewatch || AGN || align=right | 1.3 km || 
|-id=080 bgcolor=#E9E9E9
| 324080 ||  || — || November 25, 2005 || Kitt Peak || Spacewatch || — || align=right | 1.7 km || 
|-id=081 bgcolor=#d6d6d6
| 324081 ||  || — || November 28, 2005 || Mount Lemmon || Mount Lemmon Survey || — || align=right | 3.4 km || 
|-id=082 bgcolor=#d6d6d6
| 324082 ||  || — || November 28, 2005 || Socorro || LINEAR || BRA || align=right | 2.4 km || 
|-id=083 bgcolor=#d6d6d6
| 324083 ||  || — || November 26, 2005 || Kitt Peak || Spacewatch || — || align=right | 3.3 km || 
|-id=084 bgcolor=#d6d6d6
| 324084 ||  || — || November 22, 2005 || Kitt Peak || Spacewatch || — || align=right | 2.6 km || 
|-id=085 bgcolor=#d6d6d6
| 324085 ||  || — || November 29, 2005 || Mount Lemmon || Mount Lemmon Survey || KOR || align=right | 1.6 km || 
|-id=086 bgcolor=#d6d6d6
| 324086 ||  || — || November 25, 2005 || Catalina || CSS || 628 || align=right | 2.6 km || 
|-id=087 bgcolor=#d6d6d6
| 324087 ||  || — || November 28, 2005 || Catalina || CSS || — || align=right | 2.1 km || 
|-id=088 bgcolor=#d6d6d6
| 324088 ||  || — || November 30, 2005 || Mount Lemmon || Mount Lemmon Survey || CHA || align=right | 2.7 km || 
|-id=089 bgcolor=#E9E9E9
| 324089 ||  || — || November 30, 2005 || Mount Lemmon || Mount Lemmon Survey || — || align=right | 1.5 km || 
|-id=090 bgcolor=#E9E9E9
| 324090 ||  || — || November 25, 2005 || Mount Lemmon || Mount Lemmon Survey || — || align=right | 2.0 km || 
|-id=091 bgcolor=#E9E9E9
| 324091 ||  || — || November 25, 2005 || Mount Lemmon || Mount Lemmon Survey || — || align=right | 1.5 km || 
|-id=092 bgcolor=#d6d6d6
| 324092 ||  || — || November 26, 2005 || Mount Lemmon || Mount Lemmon Survey || — || align=right | 3.4 km || 
|-id=093 bgcolor=#d6d6d6
| 324093 ||  || — || November 29, 2005 || Kitt Peak || Spacewatch || — || align=right | 2.1 km || 
|-id=094 bgcolor=#d6d6d6
| 324094 ||  || — || November 25, 2005 || Kitt Peak || Spacewatch || — || align=right | 1.9 km || 
|-id=095 bgcolor=#E9E9E9
| 324095 ||  || — || November 29, 2005 || Kitt Peak || Spacewatch || — || align=right | 2.8 km || 
|-id=096 bgcolor=#d6d6d6
| 324096 ||  || — || November 29, 2005 || Palomar || NEAT || — || align=right | 3.3 km || 
|-id=097 bgcolor=#d6d6d6
| 324097 ||  || — || November 28, 2005 || Mount Lemmon || Mount Lemmon Survey || — || align=right | 4.7 km || 
|-id=098 bgcolor=#d6d6d6
| 324098 ||  || — || November 29, 2005 || Mount Lemmon || Mount Lemmon Survey || KOR || align=right | 1.2 km || 
|-id=099 bgcolor=#E9E9E9
| 324099 ||  || — || November 29, 2005 || Catalina || CSS || — || align=right | 2.7 km || 
|-id=100 bgcolor=#d6d6d6
| 324100 ||  || — || November 30, 2005 || Socorro || LINEAR || — || align=right | 3.5 km || 
|}

324101–324200 

|-bgcolor=#d6d6d6
| 324101 ||  || — || November 30, 2005 || Kitt Peak || Spacewatch || — || align=right | 3.6 km || 
|-id=102 bgcolor=#d6d6d6
| 324102 ||  || — || December 1, 2005 || Kitt Peak || Spacewatch || CHA || align=right | 2.3 km || 
|-id=103 bgcolor=#d6d6d6
| 324103 ||  || — || December 2, 2005 || Kitt Peak || Spacewatch || CHA || align=right | 2.4 km || 
|-id=104 bgcolor=#E9E9E9
| 324104 ||  || — || December 2, 2005 || Mount Lemmon || Mount Lemmon Survey || MRX || align=right | 1.2 km || 
|-id=105 bgcolor=#E9E9E9
| 324105 ||  || — || December 1, 2005 || Mount Lemmon || Mount Lemmon Survey || — || align=right | 3.1 km || 
|-id=106 bgcolor=#d6d6d6
| 324106 ||  || — || December 2, 2005 || Kitt Peak || Spacewatch || — || align=right | 3.6 km || 
|-id=107 bgcolor=#d6d6d6
| 324107 ||  || — || December 2, 2005 || Kitt Peak || Spacewatch || — || align=right | 2.5 km || 
|-id=108 bgcolor=#d6d6d6
| 324108 ||  || — || December 1, 2005 || Mount Lemmon || Mount Lemmon Survey || KOR || align=right | 1.5 km || 
|-id=109 bgcolor=#E9E9E9
| 324109 ||  || — || December 6, 2005 || Kitt Peak || Spacewatch || AGN || align=right | 1.4 km || 
|-id=110 bgcolor=#d6d6d6
| 324110 ||  || — || December 6, 2005 || Kitt Peak || Spacewatch || — || align=right | 4.1 km || 
|-id=111 bgcolor=#d6d6d6
| 324111 ||  || — || December 2, 2005 || Mount Lemmon || Mount Lemmon Survey || — || align=right | 2.5 km || 
|-id=112 bgcolor=#d6d6d6
| 324112 ||  || — || December 7, 2005 || Catalina || CSS || AEG || align=right | 3.9 km || 
|-id=113 bgcolor=#d6d6d6
| 324113 ||  || — || December 8, 2005 || Kitt Peak || Spacewatch || — || align=right | 2.5 km || 
|-id=114 bgcolor=#d6d6d6
| 324114 ||  || — || December 1, 2005 || Kitt Peak || M. W. Buie || EOS || align=right | 3.0 km || 
|-id=115 bgcolor=#d6d6d6
| 324115 ||  || — || December 5, 2005 || Kitt Peak || Spacewatch || — || align=right | 3.5 km || 
|-id=116 bgcolor=#d6d6d6
| 324116 ||  || — || December 22, 2005 || Kitt Peak || Spacewatch || — || align=right | 2.8 km || 
|-id=117 bgcolor=#d6d6d6
| 324117 ||  || — || December 22, 2005 || Kitt Peak || Spacewatch || — || align=right | 3.7 km || 
|-id=118 bgcolor=#d6d6d6
| 324118 ||  || — || December 22, 2005 || Kitt Peak || Spacewatch || — || align=right | 3.2 km || 
|-id=119 bgcolor=#d6d6d6
| 324119 ||  || — || December 23, 2005 || Kitt Peak || Spacewatch || KOR || align=right | 1.3 km || 
|-id=120 bgcolor=#d6d6d6
| 324120 ||  || — || December 23, 2005 || Kitt Peak || Spacewatch || — || align=right | 2.0 km || 
|-id=121 bgcolor=#d6d6d6
| 324121 ||  || — || December 23, 2005 || Kitt Peak || Spacewatch || K-2 || align=right | 1.3 km || 
|-id=122 bgcolor=#d6d6d6
| 324122 ||  || — || December 25, 2005 || Kitt Peak || Spacewatch || — || align=right | 2.3 km || 
|-id=123 bgcolor=#d6d6d6
| 324123 ||  || — || December 22, 2005 || Kitt Peak || Spacewatch || — || align=right | 4.4 km || 
|-id=124 bgcolor=#d6d6d6
| 324124 ||  || — || December 22, 2005 || Kitt Peak || Spacewatch || — || align=right | 3.0 km || 
|-id=125 bgcolor=#d6d6d6
| 324125 ||  || — || November 1, 2005 || Mount Lemmon || Mount Lemmon Survey || — || align=right | 3.5 km || 
|-id=126 bgcolor=#d6d6d6
| 324126 ||  || — || December 22, 2005 || Catalina || CSS || — || align=right | 3.6 km || 
|-id=127 bgcolor=#d6d6d6
| 324127 ||  || — || December 22, 2005 || Kitt Peak || Spacewatch || — || align=right | 2.6 km || 
|-id=128 bgcolor=#d6d6d6
| 324128 ||  || — || December 25, 2005 || Kitt Peak || Spacewatch || — || align=right | 2.8 km || 
|-id=129 bgcolor=#d6d6d6
| 324129 ||  || — || September 30, 2005 || Mount Lemmon || Mount Lemmon Survey || EOS || align=right | 2.7 km || 
|-id=130 bgcolor=#d6d6d6
| 324130 ||  || — || December 25, 2005 || Kitt Peak || Spacewatch || EOS || align=right | 2.6 km || 
|-id=131 bgcolor=#d6d6d6
| 324131 ||  || — || December 25, 2005 || Kitt Peak || Spacewatch || — || align=right | 2.9 km || 
|-id=132 bgcolor=#d6d6d6
| 324132 ||  || — || December 21, 2005 || Kitt Peak || Spacewatch || — || align=right | 2.8 km || 
|-id=133 bgcolor=#d6d6d6
| 324133 ||  || — || December 22, 2005 || Kitt Peak || Spacewatch || EUP || align=right | 4.7 km || 
|-id=134 bgcolor=#d6d6d6
| 324134 ||  || — || December 25, 2005 || Kitt Peak || Spacewatch || — || align=right | 2.3 km || 
|-id=135 bgcolor=#d6d6d6
| 324135 ||  || — || December 25, 2005 || Kitt Peak || Spacewatch || HYG || align=right | 3.0 km || 
|-id=136 bgcolor=#d6d6d6
| 324136 ||  || — || December 25, 2005 || Mount Lemmon || Mount Lemmon Survey || — || align=right | 2.5 km || 
|-id=137 bgcolor=#d6d6d6
| 324137 ||  || — || December 2, 2005 || Mount Lemmon || Mount Lemmon Survey || — || align=right | 3.6 km || 
|-id=138 bgcolor=#d6d6d6
| 324138 ||  || — || November 1, 2005 || Mount Lemmon || Mount Lemmon Survey || — || align=right | 3.2 km || 
|-id=139 bgcolor=#d6d6d6
| 324139 ||  || — || December 25, 2005 || Mount Lemmon || Mount Lemmon Survey || — || align=right | 3.1 km || 
|-id=140 bgcolor=#d6d6d6
| 324140 ||  || — || December 26, 2005 || Mount Lemmon || Mount Lemmon Survey || — || align=right | 2.8 km || 
|-id=141 bgcolor=#d6d6d6
| 324141 ||  || — || December 26, 2005 || Mount Lemmon || Mount Lemmon Survey || — || align=right | 3.7 km || 
|-id=142 bgcolor=#d6d6d6
| 324142 ||  || — || December 27, 2005 || Mount Lemmon || Mount Lemmon Survey || — || align=right | 2.8 km || 
|-id=143 bgcolor=#d6d6d6
| 324143 ||  || — || December 25, 2005 || Mount Lemmon || Mount Lemmon Survey || — || align=right | 3.4 km || 
|-id=144 bgcolor=#d6d6d6
| 324144 ||  || — || December 25, 2005 || Kitt Peak || Spacewatch || — || align=right | 4.5 km || 
|-id=145 bgcolor=#d6d6d6
| 324145 ||  || — || December 25, 2005 || Kitt Peak || Spacewatch || — || align=right | 4.2 km || 
|-id=146 bgcolor=#d6d6d6
| 324146 ||  || — || December 26, 2005 || Kitt Peak || Spacewatch || TEL || align=right | 1.4 km || 
|-id=147 bgcolor=#d6d6d6
| 324147 ||  || — || December 28, 2005 || Mount Lemmon || Mount Lemmon Survey || — || align=right | 2.5 km || 
|-id=148 bgcolor=#d6d6d6
| 324148 ||  || — || October 27, 2005 || Mount Lemmon || Mount Lemmon Survey || NAE || align=right | 3.4 km || 
|-id=149 bgcolor=#d6d6d6
| 324149 ||  || — || December 29, 2005 || Catalina || CSS || — || align=right | 4.4 km || 
|-id=150 bgcolor=#d6d6d6
| 324150 ||  || — || December 27, 2005 || Mount Lemmon || Mount Lemmon Survey || EOS || align=right | 2.3 km || 
|-id=151 bgcolor=#d6d6d6
| 324151 ||  || — || December 27, 2005 || Kitt Peak || Spacewatch || EOS || align=right | 2.4 km || 
|-id=152 bgcolor=#fefefe
| 324152 ||  || — || December 29, 2005 || Kitt Peak || Spacewatch || H || align=right | 1.1 km || 
|-id=153 bgcolor=#d6d6d6
| 324153 ||  || — || December 29, 2005 || Palomar || NEAT || — || align=right | 4.8 km || 
|-id=154 bgcolor=#d6d6d6
| 324154 ||  || — || December 22, 2005 || Kitt Peak || Spacewatch || — || align=right | 2.8 km || 
|-id=155 bgcolor=#d6d6d6
| 324155 ||  || — || December 22, 2005 || Kitt Peak || Spacewatch || — || align=right | 3.8 km || 
|-id=156 bgcolor=#d6d6d6
| 324156 ||  || — || December 25, 2005 || Mount Lemmon || Mount Lemmon Survey || EOS || align=right | 1.8 km || 
|-id=157 bgcolor=#d6d6d6
| 324157 ||  || — || December 30, 2005 || Kitt Peak || Spacewatch || EOS || align=right | 2.1 km || 
|-id=158 bgcolor=#d6d6d6
| 324158 ||  || — || December 30, 2005 || Kitt Peak || Spacewatch || — || align=right | 3.1 km || 
|-id=159 bgcolor=#d6d6d6
| 324159 ||  || — || December 25, 2005 || Mount Lemmon || Mount Lemmon Survey || — || align=right | 4.4 km || 
|-id=160 bgcolor=#d6d6d6
| 324160 ||  || — || December 24, 2005 || Kitt Peak || Spacewatch || — || align=right | 3.2 km || 
|-id=161 bgcolor=#d6d6d6
| 324161 ||  || — || November 30, 2005 || Mount Lemmon || Mount Lemmon Survey || EOS || align=right | 2.4 km || 
|-id=162 bgcolor=#d6d6d6
| 324162 ||  || — || December 24, 2005 || Catalina || CSS || — || align=right | 4.2 km || 
|-id=163 bgcolor=#d6d6d6
| 324163 ||  || — || December 28, 2005 || Kitt Peak || Spacewatch || — || align=right | 4.2 km || 
|-id=164 bgcolor=#d6d6d6
| 324164 ||  || — || December 30, 2005 || Kitt Peak || Spacewatch || KOR || align=right | 1.7 km || 
|-id=165 bgcolor=#d6d6d6
| 324165 ||  || — || December 25, 2005 || Kitt Peak || Spacewatch || — || align=right | 2.5 km || 
|-id=166 bgcolor=#d6d6d6
| 324166 ||  || — || December 25, 2005 || Kitt Peak || Spacewatch || — || align=right | 2.4 km || 
|-id=167 bgcolor=#d6d6d6
| 324167 ||  || — || December 27, 2005 || Mount Lemmon || Mount Lemmon Survey || — || align=right | 3.2 km || 
|-id=168 bgcolor=#E9E9E9
| 324168 ||  || — || December 25, 2005 || Mount Lemmon || Mount Lemmon Survey || — || align=right | 2.6 km || 
|-id=169 bgcolor=#d6d6d6
| 324169 ||  || — || December 27, 2005 || Kitt Peak || Spacewatch || — || align=right | 3.9 km || 
|-id=170 bgcolor=#d6d6d6
| 324170 ||  || — || December 28, 2005 || Kitt Peak || Spacewatch || THM || align=right | 2.0 km || 
|-id=171 bgcolor=#d6d6d6
| 324171 ||  || — || January 2, 2006 || Socorro || LINEAR || — || align=right | 3.9 km || 
|-id=172 bgcolor=#d6d6d6
| 324172 ||  || — || December 29, 2005 || Palomar || NEAT || EMA || align=right | 3.7 km || 
|-id=173 bgcolor=#d6d6d6
| 324173 ||  || — || January 5, 2006 || Catalina || CSS || — || align=right | 4.3 km || 
|-id=174 bgcolor=#d6d6d6
| 324174 ||  || — || December 28, 2005 || Kitt Peak || Spacewatch || — || align=right | 2.6 km || 
|-id=175 bgcolor=#d6d6d6
| 324175 ||  || — || January 5, 2006 || Mount Lemmon || Mount Lemmon Survey || EOS || align=right | 2.4 km || 
|-id=176 bgcolor=#d6d6d6
| 324176 ||  || — || January 5, 2006 || Catalina || CSS || EUP || align=right | 4.8 km || 
|-id=177 bgcolor=#d6d6d6
| 324177 ||  || — || January 5, 2006 || Kitt Peak || Spacewatch || — || align=right | 3.0 km || 
|-id=178 bgcolor=#d6d6d6
| 324178 ||  || — || December 1, 2005 || Mount Lemmon || Mount Lemmon Survey || HYG || align=right | 2.7 km || 
|-id=179 bgcolor=#d6d6d6
| 324179 ||  || — || January 5, 2006 || Kitt Peak || Spacewatch || THM || align=right | 1.9 km || 
|-id=180 bgcolor=#d6d6d6
| 324180 ||  || — || January 4, 2006 || Mount Lemmon || Mount Lemmon Survey || — || align=right | 3.5 km || 
|-id=181 bgcolor=#d6d6d6
| 324181 ||  || — || January 4, 2006 || Kitt Peak || Spacewatch || — || align=right | 2.8 km || 
|-id=182 bgcolor=#d6d6d6
| 324182 ||  || — || January 4, 2006 || Kitt Peak || Spacewatch || — || align=right | 3.8 km || 
|-id=183 bgcolor=#d6d6d6
| 324183 ||  || — || January 4, 2006 || Kitt Peak || Spacewatch || — || align=right | 3.7 km || 
|-id=184 bgcolor=#d6d6d6
| 324184 ||  || — || January 5, 2006 || Kitt Peak || Spacewatch || — || align=right | 3.7 km || 
|-id=185 bgcolor=#d6d6d6
| 324185 ||  || — || December 24, 2005 || Kitt Peak || Spacewatch || — || align=right | 2.9 km || 
|-id=186 bgcolor=#d6d6d6
| 324186 ||  || — || January 5, 2006 || Kitt Peak || Spacewatch || — || align=right | 2.8 km || 
|-id=187 bgcolor=#d6d6d6
| 324187 ||  || — || January 4, 2006 || Kitt Peak || Spacewatch || KOR || align=right | 1.6 km || 
|-id=188 bgcolor=#d6d6d6
| 324188 ||  || — || January 5, 2006 || Kitt Peak || Spacewatch || — || align=right | 3.3 km || 
|-id=189 bgcolor=#d6d6d6
| 324189 ||  || — || December 25, 2005 || Kitt Peak || Spacewatch || — || align=right | 2.7 km || 
|-id=190 bgcolor=#d6d6d6
| 324190 ||  || — || January 6, 2006 || Mount Lemmon || Mount Lemmon Survey || — || align=right | 2.8 km || 
|-id=191 bgcolor=#d6d6d6
| 324191 ||  || — || January 8, 2006 || Kitt Peak || Spacewatch || — || align=right | 3.4 km || 
|-id=192 bgcolor=#d6d6d6
| 324192 ||  || — || January 9, 2006 || Kitt Peak || Spacewatch || — || align=right | 3.3 km || 
|-id=193 bgcolor=#d6d6d6
| 324193 ||  || — || January 9, 2006 || Kitt Peak || Spacewatch || — || align=right | 2.5 km || 
|-id=194 bgcolor=#d6d6d6
| 324194 ||  || — || January 5, 2006 || Mount Lemmon || Mount Lemmon Survey || — || align=right | 2.5 km || 
|-id=195 bgcolor=#d6d6d6
| 324195 ||  || — || December 29, 2005 || Kitt Peak || Spacewatch || — || align=right | 2.8 km || 
|-id=196 bgcolor=#d6d6d6
| 324196 ||  || — || January 6, 2006 || Kitt Peak || Spacewatch || — || align=right | 3.8 km || 
|-id=197 bgcolor=#d6d6d6
| 324197 ||  || — || January 6, 2006 || Mount Lemmon || Mount Lemmon Survey || — || align=right | 2.9 km || 
|-id=198 bgcolor=#d6d6d6
| 324198 ||  || — || January 8, 2006 || Mount Lemmon || Mount Lemmon Survey || — || align=right | 2.5 km || 
|-id=199 bgcolor=#d6d6d6
| 324199 ||  || — || January 8, 2006 || Mount Lemmon || Mount Lemmon Survey || — || align=right | 4.0 km || 
|-id=200 bgcolor=#d6d6d6
| 324200 ||  || — || January 6, 2006 || Anderson Mesa || LONEOS || EUP || align=right | 5.2 km || 
|}

324201–324300 

|-bgcolor=#d6d6d6
| 324201 ||  || — || January 9, 2006 || Kitt Peak || Spacewatch || — || align=right | 3.2 km || 
|-id=202 bgcolor=#d6d6d6
| 324202 ||  || — || January 6, 2006 || Catalina || CSS || — || align=right | 5.2 km || 
|-id=203 bgcolor=#d6d6d6
| 324203 ||  || — || January 5, 2006 || Mount Lemmon || Mount Lemmon Survey || — || align=right | 3.4 km || 
|-id=204 bgcolor=#d6d6d6
| 324204 ||  || — || January 7, 2006 || Mount Lemmon || Mount Lemmon Survey || MRC || align=right | 3.0 km || 
|-id=205 bgcolor=#d6d6d6
| 324205 ||  || — || January 12, 2006 || Palomar || NEAT || — || align=right | 4.9 km || 
|-id=206 bgcolor=#d6d6d6
| 324206 ||  || — || January 6, 2006 || Catalina || CSS || ALA || align=right | 4.1 km || 
|-id=207 bgcolor=#d6d6d6
| 324207 ||  || — || January 7, 2006 || Mount Lemmon || Mount Lemmon Survey || — || align=right | 3.1 km || 
|-id=208 bgcolor=#d6d6d6
| 324208 ||  || — || January 7, 2006 || Mauna Kea || P. A. Wiegert || — || align=right | 2.7 km || 
|-id=209 bgcolor=#d6d6d6
| 324209 ||  || — || January 20, 2006 || Catalina || CSS || — || align=right | 5.6 km || 
|-id=210 bgcolor=#d6d6d6
| 324210 ||  || — || January 20, 2006 || Kitt Peak || Spacewatch || EOS || align=right | 2.6 km || 
|-id=211 bgcolor=#d6d6d6
| 324211 ||  || — || January 22, 2006 || Mount Lemmon || Mount Lemmon Survey || THM || align=right | 2.1 km || 
|-id=212 bgcolor=#d6d6d6
| 324212 ||  || — || January 23, 2006 || Catalina || CSS || LIX || align=right | 4.9 km || 
|-id=213 bgcolor=#d6d6d6
| 324213 ||  || — || January 22, 2006 || Mount Lemmon || Mount Lemmon Survey || KOR || align=right | 1.8 km || 
|-id=214 bgcolor=#d6d6d6
| 324214 ||  || — || January 20, 2006 || Kitt Peak || Spacewatch || HYG || align=right | 3.5 km || 
|-id=215 bgcolor=#d6d6d6
| 324215 ||  || — || January 21, 2006 || Kitt Peak || Spacewatch || — || align=right | 5.1 km || 
|-id=216 bgcolor=#d6d6d6
| 324216 ||  || — || January 21, 2006 || Kitt Peak || Spacewatch || URS || align=right | 3.8 km || 
|-id=217 bgcolor=#d6d6d6
| 324217 ||  || — || January 24, 2006 || Nyukasa || Mount Nyukasa Stn. || — || align=right | 4.0 km || 
|-id=218 bgcolor=#d6d6d6
| 324218 ||  || — || January 22, 2006 || Mount Lemmon || Mount Lemmon Survey || — || align=right | 5.1 km || 
|-id=219 bgcolor=#d6d6d6
| 324219 ||  || — || January 23, 2006 || Kitt Peak || Spacewatch || EUP || align=right | 5.2 km || 
|-id=220 bgcolor=#d6d6d6
| 324220 ||  || — || January 25, 2006 || Kitt Peak || Spacewatch || — || align=right | 2.6 km || 
|-id=221 bgcolor=#d6d6d6
| 324221 ||  || — || January 22, 2006 || Catalina || CSS || — || align=right | 3.0 km || 
|-id=222 bgcolor=#d6d6d6
| 324222 ||  || — || January 26, 2006 || Kitt Peak || Spacewatch || — || align=right | 3.1 km || 
|-id=223 bgcolor=#d6d6d6
| 324223 ||  || — || January 22, 2006 || Catalina || CSS || — || align=right | 5.1 km || 
|-id=224 bgcolor=#d6d6d6
| 324224 ||  || — || January 23, 2006 || Kitt Peak || Spacewatch || — || align=right | 3.8 km || 
|-id=225 bgcolor=#d6d6d6
| 324225 ||  || — || January 23, 2006 || Kitt Peak || Spacewatch || EOS || align=right | 2.9 km || 
|-id=226 bgcolor=#d6d6d6
| 324226 ||  || — || January 23, 2006 || Kitt Peak || Spacewatch || THM || align=right | 2.6 km || 
|-id=227 bgcolor=#d6d6d6
| 324227 ||  || — || January 26, 2006 || Kitt Peak || Spacewatch || — || align=right | 3.0 km || 
|-id=228 bgcolor=#d6d6d6
| 324228 ||  || — || January 29, 2006 || Marly || Naef Obs. || URS || align=right | 5.0 km || 
|-id=229 bgcolor=#d6d6d6
| 324229 ||  || — || January 23, 2006 || Kitt Peak || Spacewatch || — || align=right | 3.3 km || 
|-id=230 bgcolor=#d6d6d6
| 324230 ||  || — || January 25, 2006 || Kitt Peak || Spacewatch || THM || align=right | 2.4 km || 
|-id=231 bgcolor=#d6d6d6
| 324231 ||  || — || January 25, 2006 || Kitt Peak || Spacewatch || EOS || align=right | 2.6 km || 
|-id=232 bgcolor=#d6d6d6
| 324232 ||  || — || January 25, 2006 || Kitt Peak || Spacewatch || THM || align=right | 2.4 km || 
|-id=233 bgcolor=#d6d6d6
| 324233 ||  || — || January 26, 2006 || Kitt Peak || Spacewatch || — || align=right | 3.6 km || 
|-id=234 bgcolor=#d6d6d6
| 324234 ||  || — || January 26, 2006 || Kitt Peak || Spacewatch || — || align=right | 2.8 km || 
|-id=235 bgcolor=#d6d6d6
| 324235 ||  || — || January 26, 2006 || Kitt Peak || Spacewatch || — || align=right | 3.3 km || 
|-id=236 bgcolor=#d6d6d6
| 324236 ||  || — || January 26, 2006 || Mount Lemmon || Mount Lemmon Survey || — || align=right | 3.7 km || 
|-id=237 bgcolor=#C2FFFF
| 324237 ||  || — || January 26, 2006 || Kitt Peak || Spacewatch || L5 || align=right | 9.4 km || 
|-id=238 bgcolor=#d6d6d6
| 324238 ||  || — || January 26, 2006 || Kitt Peak || Spacewatch || — || align=right | 3.9 km || 
|-id=239 bgcolor=#d6d6d6
| 324239 ||  || — || January 27, 2006 || Mount Lemmon || Mount Lemmon Survey || — || align=right | 3.7 km || 
|-id=240 bgcolor=#d6d6d6
| 324240 ||  || — || January 25, 2006 || Anderson Mesa || LONEOS || — || align=right | 3.7 km || 
|-id=241 bgcolor=#d6d6d6
| 324241 ||  || — || January 25, 2006 || Kitt Peak || Spacewatch || — || align=right | 3.9 km || 
|-id=242 bgcolor=#d6d6d6
| 324242 ||  || — || January 26, 2006 || Kitt Peak || Spacewatch || — || align=right | 4.1 km || 
|-id=243 bgcolor=#d6d6d6
| 324243 ||  || — || January 26, 2006 || Catalina || CSS || EUP || align=right | 6.0 km || 
|-id=244 bgcolor=#d6d6d6
| 324244 ||  || — || October 7, 2005 || Mauna Kea || A. Boattini || — || align=right | 2.9 km || 
|-id=245 bgcolor=#d6d6d6
| 324245 ||  || — || January 26, 2006 || Kitt Peak || Spacewatch || — || align=right | 3.8 km || 
|-id=246 bgcolor=#d6d6d6
| 324246 ||  || — || January 26, 2006 || Mount Lemmon || Mount Lemmon Survey || — || align=right | 3.8 km || 
|-id=247 bgcolor=#d6d6d6
| 324247 ||  || — || January 26, 2006 || Kitt Peak || Spacewatch || — || align=right | 3.1 km || 
|-id=248 bgcolor=#d6d6d6
| 324248 ||  || — || January 27, 2006 || Kitt Peak || Spacewatch || — || align=right | 2.8 km || 
|-id=249 bgcolor=#d6d6d6
| 324249 ||  || — || January 27, 2006 || Kitt Peak || Spacewatch || — || align=right | 3.5 km || 
|-id=250 bgcolor=#d6d6d6
| 324250 ||  || — || January 27, 2006 || Mount Lemmon || Mount Lemmon Survey || EOS || align=right | 1.9 km || 
|-id=251 bgcolor=#d6d6d6
| 324251 ||  || — || January 28, 2006 || Mount Lemmon || Mount Lemmon Survey || — || align=right | 2.9 km || 
|-id=252 bgcolor=#d6d6d6
| 324252 ||  || — || January 28, 2006 || Mount Lemmon || Mount Lemmon Survey || — || align=right | 4.8 km || 
|-id=253 bgcolor=#d6d6d6
| 324253 ||  || — || January 28, 2006 || Mount Lemmon || Mount Lemmon Survey || — || align=right | 3.4 km || 
|-id=254 bgcolor=#d6d6d6
| 324254 ||  || — || January 28, 2006 || Kitt Peak || Spacewatch || HYG || align=right | 3.1 km || 
|-id=255 bgcolor=#d6d6d6
| 324255 ||  || — || January 31, 2006 || Kitt Peak || Spacewatch || — || align=right | 4.0 km || 
|-id=256 bgcolor=#d6d6d6
| 324256 ||  || — || January 31, 2006 || Catalina || CSS || — || align=right | 3.9 km || 
|-id=257 bgcolor=#d6d6d6
| 324257 ||  || — || January 31, 2006 || Kitt Peak || Spacewatch || — || align=right | 3.1 km || 
|-id=258 bgcolor=#d6d6d6
| 324258 ||  || — || January 31, 2006 || Kitt Peak || Spacewatch || — || align=right | 3.3 km || 
|-id=259 bgcolor=#d6d6d6
| 324259 ||  || — || January 24, 2006 || Anderson Mesa || LONEOS || URS || align=right | 4.3 km || 
|-id=260 bgcolor=#d6d6d6
| 324260 ||  || — || January 29, 2006 || Catalina || CSS || — || align=right | 4.5 km || 
|-id=261 bgcolor=#d6d6d6
| 324261 ||  || — || January 30, 2006 || Catalina || CSS || EUP || align=right | 4.2 km || 
|-id=262 bgcolor=#d6d6d6
| 324262 ||  || — || January 30, 2006 || Kitt Peak || Spacewatch || LIX || align=right | 3.2 km || 
|-id=263 bgcolor=#d6d6d6
| 324263 ||  || — || January 31, 2006 || Kitt Peak || Spacewatch || — || align=right | 3.8 km || 
|-id=264 bgcolor=#d6d6d6
| 324264 ||  || — || February 4, 1995 || Kitt Peak || Spacewatch || — || align=right | 2.6 km || 
|-id=265 bgcolor=#d6d6d6
| 324265 ||  || — || March 29, 2001 || Kitt Peak || Spacewatch || HYG || align=right | 2.6 km || 
|-id=266 bgcolor=#d6d6d6
| 324266 ||  || — || January 31, 2006 || Kitt Peak || Spacewatch || — || align=right | 2.6 km || 
|-id=267 bgcolor=#d6d6d6
| 324267 ||  || — || January 31, 2006 || Kitt Peak || Spacewatch || HYG || align=right | 2.6 km || 
|-id=268 bgcolor=#d6d6d6
| 324268 ||  || — || January 30, 2006 || Kitt Peak || Spacewatch || — || align=right | 3.8 km || 
|-id=269 bgcolor=#d6d6d6
| 324269 ||  || — || January 23, 2006 || Kitt Peak || Spacewatch || THM || align=right | 2.0 km || 
|-id=270 bgcolor=#d6d6d6
| 324270 ||  || — || January 26, 2006 || Mount Lemmon || Mount Lemmon Survey || HYG || align=right | 2.8 km || 
|-id=271 bgcolor=#d6d6d6
| 324271 ||  || — || January 22, 2006 || Mount Lemmon || Mount Lemmon Survey || — || align=right | 2.7 km || 
|-id=272 bgcolor=#d6d6d6
| 324272 ||  || — || January 25, 2006 || Kitt Peak || Spacewatch || — || align=right | 3.3 km || 
|-id=273 bgcolor=#d6d6d6
| 324273 ||  || — || January 22, 2006 || Mount Lemmon || Mount Lemmon Survey || EOS || align=right | 2.3 km || 
|-id=274 bgcolor=#d6d6d6
| 324274 ||  || — || January 23, 2006 || Mount Lemmon || Mount Lemmon Survey || THM || align=right | 2.6 km || 
|-id=275 bgcolor=#d6d6d6
| 324275 ||  || — || February 4, 2006 || Wrightwood || J. W. Young || TEL || align=right | 2.2 km || 
|-id=276 bgcolor=#d6d6d6
| 324276 ||  || — || February 1, 2006 || Kitt Peak || Spacewatch || — || align=right | 3.5 km || 
|-id=277 bgcolor=#d6d6d6
| 324277 ||  || — || February 2, 2006 || Kitt Peak || Spacewatch || EOS || align=right | 2.8 km || 
|-id=278 bgcolor=#d6d6d6
| 324278 ||  || — || February 2, 2006 || Mount Lemmon || Mount Lemmon Survey || — || align=right | 4.1 km || 
|-id=279 bgcolor=#d6d6d6
| 324279 ||  || — || February 2, 2006 || Kitt Peak || Spacewatch || — || align=right | 4.3 km || 
|-id=280 bgcolor=#d6d6d6
| 324280 ||  || — || February 3, 2006 || Kitt Peak || Spacewatch || — || align=right | 2.5 km || 
|-id=281 bgcolor=#d6d6d6
| 324281 ||  || — || February 3, 2006 || Kitt Peak || Spacewatch || VER || align=right | 3.2 km || 
|-id=282 bgcolor=#d6d6d6
| 324282 ||  || — || February 3, 2006 || Socorro || LINEAR || — || align=right | 5.0 km || 
|-id=283 bgcolor=#d6d6d6
| 324283 ||  || — || February 4, 2006 || Mount Lemmon || Mount Lemmon Survey || THM || align=right | 2.4 km || 
|-id=284 bgcolor=#d6d6d6
| 324284 ||  || — || February 6, 2006 || Kitt Peak || Spacewatch || EMA || align=right | 4.1 km || 
|-id=285 bgcolor=#d6d6d6
| 324285 ||  || — || March 21, 2001 || Anderson Mesa || LONEOS || — || align=right | 4.0 km || 
|-id=286 bgcolor=#d6d6d6
| 324286 ||  || — || December 7, 2005 || Catalina || CSS || EUP || align=right | 4.6 km || 
|-id=287 bgcolor=#d6d6d6
| 324287 || 2006 DO || — || February 20, 2006 || Vicques || M. Ory || EOS || align=right | 2.5 km || 
|-id=288 bgcolor=#d6d6d6
| 324288 ||  || — || February 21, 2006 || Catalina || CSS || TIR || align=right | 4.7 km || 
|-id=289 bgcolor=#d6d6d6
| 324289 ||  || — || February 20, 2006 || Kitt Peak || Spacewatch || — || align=right | 2.9 km || 
|-id=290 bgcolor=#d6d6d6
| 324290 ||  || — || February 20, 2006 || Kitt Peak || Spacewatch || — || align=right | 4.0 km || 
|-id=291 bgcolor=#d6d6d6
| 324291 ||  || — || February 20, 2006 || Kitt Peak || Spacewatch || — || align=right | 3.6 km || 
|-id=292 bgcolor=#d6d6d6
| 324292 ||  || — || February 23, 2006 || Anderson Mesa || LONEOS || — || align=right | 4.9 km || 
|-id=293 bgcolor=#d6d6d6
| 324293 ||  || — || February 20, 2006 || Kitt Peak || Spacewatch || VER || align=right | 3.0 km || 
|-id=294 bgcolor=#d6d6d6
| 324294 ||  || — || February 20, 2006 || Mount Lemmon || Mount Lemmon Survey || HYG || align=right | 3.4 km || 
|-id=295 bgcolor=#d6d6d6
| 324295 ||  || — || February 24, 2006 || Mount Lemmon || Mount Lemmon Survey || — || align=right | 5.4 km || 
|-id=296 bgcolor=#d6d6d6
| 324296 ||  || — || February 24, 2006 || Mount Lemmon || Mount Lemmon Survey || — || align=right | 3.6 km || 
|-id=297 bgcolor=#d6d6d6
| 324297 ||  || — || February 24, 2006 || Mount Lemmon || Mount Lemmon Survey || HYG || align=right | 3.8 km || 
|-id=298 bgcolor=#d6d6d6
| 324298 ||  || — || February 21, 2006 || Kitt Peak || Spacewatch || — || align=right | 3.7 km || 
|-id=299 bgcolor=#d6d6d6
| 324299 ||  || — || February 24, 2006 || Kitt Peak || Spacewatch || — || align=right | 5.3 km || 
|-id=300 bgcolor=#d6d6d6
| 324300 ||  || — || February 24, 2006 || Kitt Peak || Spacewatch || EOS || align=right | 2.3 km || 
|}

324301–324400 

|-bgcolor=#d6d6d6
| 324301 ||  || — || February 25, 2006 || Kitt Peak || Spacewatch || — || align=right | 2.9 km || 
|-id=302 bgcolor=#d6d6d6
| 324302 ||  || — || February 25, 2006 || Kitt Peak || Spacewatch || THM || align=right | 3.0 km || 
|-id=303 bgcolor=#d6d6d6
| 324303 ||  || — || February 27, 2006 || Kitt Peak || Spacewatch || — || align=right | 3.5 km || 
|-id=304 bgcolor=#d6d6d6
| 324304 ||  || — || February 28, 2006 || Mount Lemmon || Mount Lemmon Survey || — || align=right | 3.8 km || 
|-id=305 bgcolor=#d6d6d6
| 324305 ||  || — || February 24, 2006 || Mount Lemmon || Mount Lemmon Survey || — || align=right | 3.9 km || 
|-id=306 bgcolor=#d6d6d6
| 324306 ||  || — || February 25, 2006 || Kitt Peak || Spacewatch || — || align=right | 3.2 km || 
|-id=307 bgcolor=#d6d6d6
| 324307 ||  || — || March 26, 1995 || Kitt Peak || Spacewatch || — || align=right | 3.4 km || 
|-id=308 bgcolor=#d6d6d6
| 324308 ||  || — || February 25, 2006 || Mount Lemmon || Mount Lemmon Survey || — || align=right | 3.9 km || 
|-id=309 bgcolor=#d6d6d6
| 324309 ||  || — || February 27, 2006 || Kitt Peak || Spacewatch || TIR || align=right | 4.0 km || 
|-id=310 bgcolor=#d6d6d6
| 324310 ||  || — || February 27, 2006 || Mount Lemmon || Mount Lemmon Survey || — || align=right | 4.6 km || 
|-id=311 bgcolor=#d6d6d6
| 324311 ||  || — || February 27, 2006 || Kitt Peak || Spacewatch || HYG || align=right | 3.2 km || 
|-id=312 bgcolor=#d6d6d6
| 324312 ||  || — || February 27, 2006 || Kitt Peak || Spacewatch || — || align=right | 3.4 km || 
|-id=313 bgcolor=#d6d6d6
| 324313 ||  || — || February 28, 2006 || Mount Lemmon || Mount Lemmon Survey || HYG || align=right | 2.4 km || 
|-id=314 bgcolor=#d6d6d6
| 324314 ||  || — || February 22, 2006 || Catalina || CSS || — || align=right | 3.3 km || 
|-id=315 bgcolor=#d6d6d6
| 324315 ||  || — || February 27, 2006 || Catalina || CSS || — || align=right | 4.6 km || 
|-id=316 bgcolor=#d6d6d6
| 324316 ||  || — || February 24, 2006 || Anderson Mesa || LONEOS || EUP || align=right | 4.7 km || 
|-id=317 bgcolor=#d6d6d6
| 324317 ||  || — || March 5, 2006 || Kitt Peak || Spacewatch || — || align=right | 4.0 km || 
|-id=318 bgcolor=#d6d6d6
| 324318 ||  || — || March 23, 2006 || Kitt Peak || Spacewatch || — || align=right | 3.5 km || 
|-id=319 bgcolor=#fefefe
| 324319 ||  || — || April 2, 2006 || Kitt Peak || Spacewatch || — || align=right data-sort-value="0.57" | 570 m || 
|-id=320 bgcolor=#d6d6d6
| 324320 ||  || — || April 9, 2006 || Kitt Peak || Spacewatch || — || align=right | 5.0 km || 
|-id=321 bgcolor=#d6d6d6
| 324321 ||  || — || April 26, 2006 || Mount Lemmon || Mount Lemmon Survey || — || align=right | 4.7 km || 
|-id=322 bgcolor=#FA8072
| 324322 ||  || — || April 24, 2006 || Kitt Peak || Spacewatch || — || align=right data-sort-value="0.85" | 850 m || 
|-id=323 bgcolor=#fefefe
| 324323 ||  || — || April 26, 2006 || Kitt Peak || Spacewatch || — || align=right data-sort-value="0.76" | 760 m || 
|-id=324 bgcolor=#fefefe
| 324324 ||  || — || April 29, 2006 || Kitt Peak || Spacewatch || — || align=right data-sort-value="0.64" | 640 m || 
|-id=325 bgcolor=#fefefe
| 324325 ||  || — || April 27, 2006 || Cerro Tololo || M. W. Buie || — || align=right data-sort-value="0.75" | 750 m || 
|-id=326 bgcolor=#fefefe
| 324326 ||  || — || April 27, 2006 || Cerro Tololo || M. W. Buie || — || align=right data-sort-value="0.78" | 780 m || 
|-id=327 bgcolor=#d6d6d6
| 324327 ||  || — || May 1, 2006 || Mauna Kea || P. A. Wiegert || SYL7:4 || align=right | 4.3 km || 
|-id=328 bgcolor=#fefefe
| 324328 ||  || — || May 22, 2006 || Kitt Peak || Spacewatch || — || align=right data-sort-value="0.85" | 850 m || 
|-id=329 bgcolor=#fefefe
| 324329 ||  || — || May 22, 2006 || Kitt Peak || Spacewatch || — || align=right data-sort-value="0.81" | 810 m || 
|-id=330 bgcolor=#fefefe
| 324330 ||  || — || July 18, 2006 || Lulin Observatory || LUSS || — || align=right data-sort-value="0.80" | 800 m || 
|-id=331 bgcolor=#FA8072
| 324331 ||  || — || July 21, 2006 || Catalina || CSS || — || align=right data-sort-value="0.78" | 780 m || 
|-id=332 bgcolor=#fefefe
| 324332 ||  || — || July 18, 2006 || Siding Spring || SSS || — || align=right | 1.3 km || 
|-id=333 bgcolor=#fefefe
| 324333 ||  || — || July 21, 2006 || Mount Lemmon || Mount Lemmon Survey || — || align=right data-sort-value="0.93" | 930 m || 
|-id=334 bgcolor=#fefefe
| 324334 || 2006 PO || — || August 5, 2006 || Pla D'Arguines || R. Ferrando || FLO || align=right data-sort-value="0.53" | 530 m || 
|-id=335 bgcolor=#fefefe
| 324335 ||  || — || August 12, 2006 || Palomar || NEAT || FLO || align=right data-sort-value="0.67" | 670 m || 
|-id=336 bgcolor=#fefefe
| 324336 ||  || — || August 13, 2006 || Palomar || NEAT || — || align=right data-sort-value="0.88" | 880 m || 
|-id=337 bgcolor=#fefefe
| 324337 ||  || — || August 14, 2006 || Siding Spring || SSS || — || align=right data-sort-value="0.99" | 990 m || 
|-id=338 bgcolor=#fefefe
| 324338 ||  || — || August 15, 2006 || Palomar || NEAT || NYS || align=right data-sort-value="0.80" | 800 m || 
|-id=339 bgcolor=#fefefe
| 324339 ||  || — || August 15, 2006 || Palomar || NEAT || V || align=right data-sort-value="0.83" | 830 m || 
|-id=340 bgcolor=#fefefe
| 324340 ||  || — || August 15, 2006 || Palomar || NEAT || FLO || align=right data-sort-value="0.54" | 540 m || 
|-id=341 bgcolor=#fefefe
| 324341 ||  || — || August 15, 2006 || Palomar || NEAT || FLO || align=right data-sort-value="0.74" | 740 m || 
|-id=342 bgcolor=#fefefe
| 324342 ||  || — || August 15, 2006 || Palomar || NEAT || — || align=right | 1.0 km || 
|-id=343 bgcolor=#fefefe
| 324343 ||  || — || August 17, 2006 || Palomar || NEAT || V || align=right data-sort-value="0.64" | 640 m || 
|-id=344 bgcolor=#fefefe
| 324344 ||  || — || August 19, 2006 || Reedy Creek || J. Broughton || — || align=right | 1.1 km || 
|-id=345 bgcolor=#fefefe
| 324345 ||  || — || August 16, 2006 || Siding Spring || SSS || FLO || align=right data-sort-value="0.71" | 710 m || 
|-id=346 bgcolor=#fefefe
| 324346 ||  || — || August 17, 2006 || Palomar || NEAT || V || align=right data-sort-value="0.67" | 670 m || 
|-id=347 bgcolor=#fefefe
| 324347 ||  || — || August 17, 2006 || Palomar || NEAT || FLO || align=right data-sort-value="0.69" | 690 m || 
|-id=348 bgcolor=#fefefe
| 324348 ||  || — || August 17, 2006 || Palomar || NEAT || — || align=right data-sort-value="0.97" | 970 m || 
|-id=349 bgcolor=#fefefe
| 324349 ||  || — || August 17, 2006 || Palomar || NEAT || V || align=right data-sort-value="0.79" | 790 m || 
|-id=350 bgcolor=#fefefe
| 324350 ||  || — || August 24, 2006 || Pla D'Arguines || R. Ferrando || — || align=right data-sort-value="0.98" | 980 m || 
|-id=351 bgcolor=#fefefe
| 324351 ||  || — || August 17, 2006 || Palomar || NEAT || FLO || align=right data-sort-value="0.80" | 800 m || 
|-id=352 bgcolor=#fefefe
| 324352 ||  || — || August 16, 2006 || Siding Spring || SSS || — || align=right | 1.1 km || 
|-id=353 bgcolor=#fefefe
| 324353 ||  || — || August 22, 2006 || Palomar || NEAT || NYS || align=right data-sort-value="0.73" | 730 m || 
|-id=354 bgcolor=#fefefe
| 324354 ||  || — || August 25, 2006 || Mayhill || A. Lowe || V || align=right data-sort-value="0.85" | 850 m || 
|-id=355 bgcolor=#fefefe
| 324355 ||  || — || August 21, 2006 || Socorro || LINEAR || FLO || align=right data-sort-value="0.75" | 750 m || 
|-id=356 bgcolor=#fefefe
| 324356 ||  || — || August 24, 2006 || Socorro || LINEAR || — || align=right | 1.3 km || 
|-id=357 bgcolor=#fefefe
| 324357 ||  || — || August 24, 2006 || Palomar || NEAT || — || align=right data-sort-value="0.77" | 770 m || 
|-id=358 bgcolor=#fefefe
| 324358 ||  || — || August 24, 2006 || Socorro || LINEAR || V || align=right data-sort-value="0.70" | 700 m || 
|-id=359 bgcolor=#fefefe
| 324359 ||  || — || August 28, 2006 || Catalina || CSS || V || align=right data-sort-value="0.77" | 770 m || 
|-id=360 bgcolor=#fefefe
| 324360 ||  || — || August 28, 2006 || Catalina || CSS || NYS || align=right data-sort-value="0.78" | 780 m || 
|-id=361 bgcolor=#E9E9E9
| 324361 ||  || — || August 27, 2006 || Anderson Mesa || LONEOS || MAR || align=right | 1.5 km || 
|-id=362 bgcolor=#fefefe
| 324362 ||  || — || August 27, 2006 || Anderson Mesa || LONEOS || FLO || align=right data-sort-value="0.73" | 730 m || 
|-id=363 bgcolor=#fefefe
| 324363 ||  || — || August 27, 2006 || Anderson Mesa || LONEOS || — || align=right data-sort-value="0.83" | 830 m || 
|-id=364 bgcolor=#fefefe
| 324364 ||  || — || August 29, 2006 || Catalina || CSS || — || align=right | 1.0 km || 
|-id=365 bgcolor=#fefefe
| 324365 ||  || — || August 17, 2006 || Palomar || NEAT || — || align=right | 1.2 km || 
|-id=366 bgcolor=#FA8072
| 324366 ||  || — || August 24, 2006 || Socorro || LINEAR || — || align=right | 1.2 km || 
|-id=367 bgcolor=#fefefe
| 324367 ||  || — || August 18, 2006 || Palomar || NEAT || FLO || align=right data-sort-value="0.72" | 720 m || 
|-id=368 bgcolor=#fefefe
| 324368 ||  || — || August 29, 2006 || Catalina || CSS || FLO || align=right data-sort-value="0.85" | 850 m || 
|-id=369 bgcolor=#fefefe
| 324369 ||  || — || August 29, 2006 || Catalina || CSS || FLO || align=right data-sort-value="0.85" | 850 m || 
|-id=370 bgcolor=#fefefe
| 324370 ||  || — || August 30, 2006 || Anderson Mesa || LONEOS || V || align=right data-sort-value="0.59" | 590 m || 
|-id=371 bgcolor=#fefefe
| 324371 ||  || — || August 28, 2006 || Anderson Mesa || LONEOS || NYS || align=right data-sort-value="0.72" | 720 m || 
|-id=372 bgcolor=#fefefe
| 324372 ||  || — || September 12, 2006 || Socorro || LINEAR || — || align=right data-sort-value="0.80" | 800 m || 
|-id=373 bgcolor=#fefefe
| 324373 ||  || — || September 12, 2006 || Catalina || CSS || — || align=right data-sort-value="0.88" | 880 m || 
|-id=374 bgcolor=#fefefe
| 324374 ||  || — || September 12, 2006 || Catalina || CSS || — || align=right | 1.2 km || 
|-id=375 bgcolor=#fefefe
| 324375 ||  || — || September 12, 2006 || Catalina || CSS || NYS || align=right data-sort-value="0.90" | 900 m || 
|-id=376 bgcolor=#fefefe
| 324376 ||  || — || September 14, 2006 || Palomar || NEAT || — || align=right | 1.0 km || 
|-id=377 bgcolor=#E9E9E9
| 324377 ||  || — || September 14, 2006 || Catalina || CSS || — || align=right | 4.0 km || 
|-id=378 bgcolor=#fefefe
| 324378 ||  || — || September 11, 2006 || Catalina || CSS || — || align=right data-sort-value="0.73" | 730 m || 
|-id=379 bgcolor=#fefefe
| 324379 ||  || — || September 14, 2006 || Catalina || CSS || — || align=right | 1.4 km || 
|-id=380 bgcolor=#fefefe
| 324380 ||  || — || September 12, 2006 || Catalina || CSS || — || align=right | 1.3 km || 
|-id=381 bgcolor=#fefefe
| 324381 ||  || — || September 14, 2006 || Kitt Peak || Spacewatch || — || align=right | 1.2 km || 
|-id=382 bgcolor=#fefefe
| 324382 ||  || — || September 15, 2006 || Kitt Peak || Spacewatch || — || align=right data-sort-value="0.86" | 860 m || 
|-id=383 bgcolor=#fefefe
| 324383 ||  || — || September 15, 2006 || Kitt Peak || Spacewatch || — || align=right data-sort-value="0.68" | 680 m || 
|-id=384 bgcolor=#fefefe
| 324384 ||  || — || September 15, 2006 || Kitt Peak || Spacewatch || NYS || align=right data-sort-value="0.70" | 700 m || 
|-id=385 bgcolor=#fefefe
| 324385 ||  || — || September 15, 2006 || Kitt Peak || Spacewatch || V || align=right data-sort-value="0.71" | 710 m || 
|-id=386 bgcolor=#fefefe
| 324386 ||  || — || September 15, 2006 || Kitt Peak || Spacewatch || FLO || align=right data-sort-value="0.83" | 830 m || 
|-id=387 bgcolor=#FA8072
| 324387 ||  || — || September 15, 2006 || Kitt Peak || Spacewatch || — || align=right | 2.0 km || 
|-id=388 bgcolor=#fefefe
| 324388 ||  || — || September 14, 2006 || Mauna Kea || J. Masiero || NYS || align=right data-sort-value="0.61" | 610 m || 
|-id=389 bgcolor=#fefefe
| 324389 ||  || — || September 16, 2006 || Catalina || CSS || V || align=right data-sort-value="0.86" | 860 m || 
|-id=390 bgcolor=#fefefe
| 324390 ||  || — || September 17, 2006 || Kitt Peak || Spacewatch || NYS || align=right data-sort-value="0.74" | 740 m || 
|-id=391 bgcolor=#fefefe
| 324391 ||  || — || September 16, 2006 || Anderson Mesa || LONEOS || — || align=right | 1.0 km || 
|-id=392 bgcolor=#fefefe
| 324392 ||  || — || September 17, 2006 || Anderson Mesa || LONEOS || FLO || align=right data-sort-value="0.68" | 680 m || 
|-id=393 bgcolor=#fefefe
| 324393 ||  || — || September 17, 2006 || Kitt Peak || Spacewatch || FLO || align=right data-sort-value="0.71" | 710 m || 
|-id=394 bgcolor=#fefefe
| 324394 ||  || — || September 17, 2006 || Anderson Mesa || LONEOS || V || align=right data-sort-value="0.85" | 850 m || 
|-id=395 bgcolor=#fefefe
| 324395 ||  || — || September 18, 2006 || Kitt Peak || Spacewatch || ERI || align=right | 1.8 km || 
|-id=396 bgcolor=#fefefe
| 324396 ||  || — || September 16, 2006 || Catalina || CSS || — || align=right | 1.2 km || 
|-id=397 bgcolor=#fefefe
| 324397 ||  || — || September 18, 2006 || Catalina || CSS || — || align=right | 1.3 km || 
|-id=398 bgcolor=#E9E9E9
| 324398 ||  || — || September 18, 2006 || Kitt Peak || Spacewatch || — || align=right data-sort-value="0.77" | 770 m || 
|-id=399 bgcolor=#fefefe
| 324399 ||  || — || September 18, 2006 || Kitt Peak || Spacewatch || — || align=right | 1.1 km || 
|-id=400 bgcolor=#fefefe
| 324400 ||  || — || September 19, 2006 || Kitt Peak || Spacewatch || CLA || align=right | 1.8 km || 
|}

324401–324500 

|-bgcolor=#fefefe
| 324401 ||  || — || September 19, 2006 || Catalina || CSS || V || align=right data-sort-value="0.84" | 840 m || 
|-id=402 bgcolor=#E9E9E9
| 324402 ||  || — || September 19, 2006 || Kitt Peak || Spacewatch || — || align=right data-sort-value="0.85" | 850 m || 
|-id=403 bgcolor=#fefefe
| 324403 ||  || — || September 19, 2006 || Kitt Peak || Spacewatch || — || align=right data-sort-value="0.73" | 730 m || 
|-id=404 bgcolor=#fefefe
| 324404 ||  || — || September 22, 2006 || Socorro || LINEAR || — || align=right | 1.3 km || 
|-id=405 bgcolor=#fefefe
| 324405 ||  || — || September 23, 2006 || Kitt Peak || Spacewatch || SVE || align=right | 2.7 km || 
|-id=406 bgcolor=#fefefe
| 324406 ||  || — || September 25, 2006 || Kitt Peak || Spacewatch || — || align=right data-sort-value="0.92" | 920 m || 
|-id=407 bgcolor=#E9E9E9
| 324407 ||  || — || September 26, 2006 || Mount Lemmon || Mount Lemmon Survey || MAR || align=right | 1.1 km || 
|-id=408 bgcolor=#fefefe
| 324408 ||  || — || September 24, 2006 || Kitt Peak || Spacewatch || ERI || align=right | 1.5 km || 
|-id=409 bgcolor=#fefefe
| 324409 ||  || — || September 24, 2006 || Kitt Peak || Spacewatch || V || align=right data-sort-value="0.84" | 840 m || 
|-id=410 bgcolor=#E9E9E9
| 324410 ||  || — || September 27, 2006 || Kitt Peak || Spacewatch || — || align=right | 1.4 km || 
|-id=411 bgcolor=#fefefe
| 324411 ||  || — || September 28, 2006 || Jarnac || Jarnac Obs. || — || align=right | 1.0 km || 
|-id=412 bgcolor=#fefefe
| 324412 ||  || — || September 15, 2006 || Kitt Peak || Spacewatch || — || align=right data-sort-value="0.81" | 810 m || 
|-id=413 bgcolor=#fefefe
| 324413 ||  || — || September 26, 2006 || Kitt Peak || Spacewatch || MAS || align=right data-sort-value="0.86" | 860 m || 
|-id=414 bgcolor=#fefefe
| 324414 ||  || — || September 26, 2006 || Mount Lemmon || Mount Lemmon Survey || — || align=right data-sort-value="0.80" | 800 m || 
|-id=415 bgcolor=#E9E9E9
| 324415 ||  || — || September 26, 2006 || Kitt Peak || Spacewatch || — || align=right | 1.0 km || 
|-id=416 bgcolor=#fefefe
| 324416 ||  || — || September 29, 2006 || Anderson Mesa || LONEOS || — || align=right | 1.1 km || 
|-id=417 bgcolor=#fefefe
| 324417 ||  || — || September 27, 2006 || Moletai || Molėtai Obs. || NYS || align=right data-sort-value="0.89" | 890 m || 
|-id=418 bgcolor=#fefefe
| 324418 ||  || — || September 27, 2006 || Kitt Peak || Spacewatch || FLO || align=right data-sort-value="0.80" | 800 m || 
|-id=419 bgcolor=#fefefe
| 324419 ||  || — || September 27, 2006 || Kitt Peak || Spacewatch || — || align=right | 1.3 km || 
|-id=420 bgcolor=#fefefe
| 324420 ||  || — || September 27, 2006 || Kitt Peak || Spacewatch || V || align=right data-sort-value="0.87" | 870 m || 
|-id=421 bgcolor=#E9E9E9
| 324421 ||  || — || September 27, 2006 || Kitt Peak || Spacewatch || BRG || align=right | 1.4 km || 
|-id=422 bgcolor=#fefefe
| 324422 ||  || — || September 27, 2006 || Kitt Peak || Spacewatch || — || align=right data-sort-value="0.97" | 970 m || 
|-id=423 bgcolor=#fefefe
| 324423 ||  || — || September 27, 2006 || Kitt Peak || Spacewatch || CLA || align=right | 1.5 km || 
|-id=424 bgcolor=#fefefe
| 324424 ||  || — || September 27, 2006 || Kitt Peak || Spacewatch || NYS || align=right data-sort-value="0.66" | 660 m || 
|-id=425 bgcolor=#fefefe
| 324425 ||  || — || September 30, 2006 || Catalina || CSS || — || align=right data-sort-value="0.99" | 990 m || 
|-id=426 bgcolor=#E9E9E9
| 324426 ||  || — || September 30, 2006 || Mount Lemmon || Mount Lemmon Survey || — || align=right | 1.3 km || 
|-id=427 bgcolor=#fefefe
| 324427 ||  || — || September 30, 2006 || Catalina || CSS || — || align=right data-sort-value="0.85" | 850 m || 
|-id=428 bgcolor=#E9E9E9
| 324428 ||  || — || September 30, 2006 || Mount Lemmon || Mount Lemmon Survey || — || align=right | 1.5 km || 
|-id=429 bgcolor=#E9E9E9
| 324429 ||  || — || September 18, 2006 || Catalina || CSS || EUN || align=right | 1.4 km || 
|-id=430 bgcolor=#fefefe
| 324430 ||  || — || September 28, 2006 || Mount Lemmon || Mount Lemmon Survey || V || align=right data-sort-value="0.77" | 770 m || 
|-id=431 bgcolor=#E9E9E9
| 324431 ||  || — || September 30, 2006 || Mount Lemmon || Mount Lemmon Survey || — || align=right data-sort-value="0.87" | 870 m || 
|-id=432 bgcolor=#fefefe
| 324432 ||  || — || September 30, 2006 || Mount Lemmon || Mount Lemmon Survey || MAS || align=right data-sort-value="0.94" | 940 m || 
|-id=433 bgcolor=#fefefe
| 324433 ||  || — || September 30, 2006 || Mount Lemmon || Mount Lemmon Survey || — || align=right | 1.0 km || 
|-id=434 bgcolor=#fefefe
| 324434 ||  || — || September 19, 2006 || Kitt Peak || Spacewatch || V || align=right data-sort-value="0.68" | 680 m || 
|-id=435 bgcolor=#fefefe
| 324435 ||  || — || October 1, 2006 || Kitt Peak || Spacewatch || NYS || align=right data-sort-value="0.77" | 770 m || 
|-id=436 bgcolor=#fefefe
| 324436 ||  || — || October 4, 2006 || Mount Lemmon || Mount Lemmon Survey || — || align=right data-sort-value="0.94" | 940 m || 
|-id=437 bgcolor=#E9E9E9
| 324437 ||  || — || October 11, 2006 || Kitt Peak || Spacewatch || — || align=right | 1.8 km || 
|-id=438 bgcolor=#E9E9E9
| 324438 ||  || — || October 12, 2006 || Kitt Peak || Spacewatch || RAF || align=right data-sort-value="0.92" | 920 m || 
|-id=439 bgcolor=#fefefe
| 324439 ||  || — || October 12, 2006 || Kitt Peak || Spacewatch || — || align=right data-sort-value="0.92" | 920 m || 
|-id=440 bgcolor=#fefefe
| 324440 ||  || — || September 26, 2006 || Mount Lemmon || Mount Lemmon Survey || V || align=right data-sort-value="0.70" | 700 m || 
|-id=441 bgcolor=#E9E9E9
| 324441 ||  || — || October 12, 2006 || Kitt Peak || Spacewatch || — || align=right | 1.2 km || 
|-id=442 bgcolor=#E9E9E9
| 324442 ||  || — || October 12, 2006 || Kitt Peak || Spacewatch || — || align=right | 1.4 km || 
|-id=443 bgcolor=#E9E9E9
| 324443 ||  || — || October 12, 2006 || Palomar || NEAT || — || align=right | 1.0 km || 
|-id=444 bgcolor=#fefefe
| 324444 ||  || — || October 11, 2006 || Palomar || NEAT || — || align=right | 1.2 km || 
|-id=445 bgcolor=#E9E9E9
| 324445 ||  || — || October 11, 2006 || Palomar || NEAT || RAF || align=right | 1.0 km || 
|-id=446 bgcolor=#E9E9E9
| 324446 ||  || — || October 12, 2006 || Kitt Peak || Spacewatch || — || align=right | 1.5 km || 
|-id=447 bgcolor=#E9E9E9
| 324447 ||  || — || October 13, 2006 || Kitt Peak || Spacewatch || — || align=right | 1.2 km || 
|-id=448 bgcolor=#E9E9E9
| 324448 ||  || — || October 15, 2006 || Kitt Peak || Spacewatch || — || align=right | 1.1 km || 
|-id=449 bgcolor=#fefefe
| 324449 ||  || — || October 15, 2006 || Kitt Peak || Spacewatch || FLO || align=right | 1.1 km || 
|-id=450 bgcolor=#E9E9E9
| 324450 ||  || — || October 15, 2006 || Kitt Peak || Spacewatch || — || align=right data-sort-value="0.93" | 930 m || 
|-id=451 bgcolor=#fefefe
| 324451 ||  || — || October 11, 2006 || Palomar || NEAT || — || align=right | 1.5 km || 
|-id=452 bgcolor=#fefefe
| 324452 ||  || — || October 2, 2006 || Mount Lemmon || Mount Lemmon Survey || — || align=right | 1.0 km || 
|-id=453 bgcolor=#fefefe
| 324453 ||  || — || October 2, 2006 || Mount Lemmon || Mount Lemmon Survey || — || align=right data-sort-value="0.89" | 890 m || 
|-id=454 bgcolor=#E9E9E9
| 324454 ||  || — || October 4, 2006 || Mount Lemmon || Mount Lemmon Survey || — || align=right | 1.4 km || 
|-id=455 bgcolor=#E9E9E9
| 324455 ||  || — || October 16, 2006 || Piszkéstető || K. Sárneczky, Z. Kuli || — || align=right | 1.1 km || 
|-id=456 bgcolor=#E9E9E9
| 324456 ||  || — || October 16, 2006 || Catalina || CSS || — || align=right | 1.5 km || 
|-id=457 bgcolor=#fefefe
| 324457 ||  || — || October 16, 2006 || Catalina || CSS || ERI || align=right | 1.9 km || 
|-id=458 bgcolor=#E9E9E9
| 324458 ||  || — || October 16, 2006 || Catalina || CSS || JUN || align=right | 1.2 km || 
|-id=459 bgcolor=#E9E9E9
| 324459 ||  || — || October 16, 2006 || Kitt Peak || Spacewatch || — || align=right data-sort-value="0.99" | 990 m || 
|-id=460 bgcolor=#E9E9E9
| 324460 ||  || — || October 17, 2006 || Mount Lemmon || Mount Lemmon Survey || — || align=right | 1.4 km || 
|-id=461 bgcolor=#E9E9E9
| 324461 ||  || — || October 17, 2006 || Mount Lemmon || Mount Lemmon Survey || — || align=right | 1.9 km || 
|-id=462 bgcolor=#fefefe
| 324462 ||  || — || October 16, 2006 || Kitt Peak || Spacewatch || NYS || align=right data-sort-value="0.76" | 760 m || 
|-id=463 bgcolor=#fefefe
| 324463 ||  || — || October 16, 2006 || Kitt Peak || Spacewatch || — || align=right | 1.1 km || 
|-id=464 bgcolor=#fefefe
| 324464 ||  || — || October 16, 2006 || Kitt Peak || Spacewatch || — || align=right data-sort-value="0.83" | 830 m || 
|-id=465 bgcolor=#fefefe
| 324465 ||  || — || October 16, 2006 || Kitt Peak || Spacewatch || MAS || align=right data-sort-value="0.72" | 720 m || 
|-id=466 bgcolor=#fefefe
| 324466 ||  || — || October 16, 2006 || Kitt Peak || Spacewatch || — || align=right | 1.2 km || 
|-id=467 bgcolor=#fefefe
| 324467 ||  || — || October 16, 2006 || Kitt Peak || Spacewatch || — || align=right | 1.4 km || 
|-id=468 bgcolor=#E9E9E9
| 324468 ||  || — || October 17, 2006 || Mount Lemmon || Mount Lemmon Survey || — || align=right | 2.1 km || 
|-id=469 bgcolor=#E9E9E9
| 324469 ||  || — || October 17, 2006 || Mount Lemmon || Mount Lemmon Survey || ADE || align=right | 3.7 km || 
|-id=470 bgcolor=#fefefe
| 324470 ||  || — || October 16, 2006 || Catalina || CSS || V || align=right data-sort-value="0.78" | 780 m || 
|-id=471 bgcolor=#E9E9E9
| 324471 ||  || — || October 17, 2006 || Kitt Peak || Spacewatch || — || align=right | 1.0 km || 
|-id=472 bgcolor=#E9E9E9
| 324472 ||  || — || October 17, 2006 || Kitt Peak || Spacewatch || — || align=right | 1.0 km || 
|-id=473 bgcolor=#fefefe
| 324473 ||  || — || October 17, 2006 || Kitt Peak || Spacewatch || — || align=right data-sort-value="0.83" | 830 m || 
|-id=474 bgcolor=#E9E9E9
| 324474 ||  || — || October 17, 2006 || Kitt Peak || Spacewatch || — || align=right | 1.8 km || 
|-id=475 bgcolor=#E9E9E9
| 324475 ||  || — || October 18, 2006 || Kitt Peak || Spacewatch || — || align=right | 1.1 km || 
|-id=476 bgcolor=#fefefe
| 324476 ||  || — || October 18, 2006 || Kitt Peak || Spacewatch || — || align=right | 1.1 km || 
|-id=477 bgcolor=#E9E9E9
| 324477 ||  || — || October 18, 2006 || Kitt Peak || Spacewatch || — || align=right | 1.1 km || 
|-id=478 bgcolor=#E9E9E9
| 324478 ||  || — || October 18, 2006 || Kitt Peak || Spacewatch || — || align=right | 1.0 km || 
|-id=479 bgcolor=#fefefe
| 324479 ||  || — || October 18, 2006 || Kitt Peak || Spacewatch || — || align=right data-sort-value="0.93" | 930 m || 
|-id=480 bgcolor=#fefefe
| 324480 ||  || — || October 18, 2006 || Kitt Peak || Spacewatch || — || align=right | 1.2 km || 
|-id=481 bgcolor=#fefefe
| 324481 ||  || — || October 18, 2006 || Kitt Peak || Spacewatch || — || align=right data-sort-value="0.92" | 920 m || 
|-id=482 bgcolor=#fefefe
| 324482 ||  || — || October 19, 2006 || Kitt Peak || Spacewatch || — || align=right data-sort-value="0.81" | 810 m || 
|-id=483 bgcolor=#E9E9E9
| 324483 ||  || — || October 19, 2006 || Kitt Peak || Spacewatch || — || align=right | 1.0 km || 
|-id=484 bgcolor=#E9E9E9
| 324484 ||  || — || October 19, 2006 || Mount Lemmon || Mount Lemmon Survey || — || align=right | 1.0 km || 
|-id=485 bgcolor=#fefefe
| 324485 ||  || — || October 19, 2006 || Kitt Peak || Spacewatch || — || align=right data-sort-value="0.98" | 980 m || 
|-id=486 bgcolor=#E9E9E9
| 324486 ||  || — || October 19, 2006 || Kitt Peak || Spacewatch || KON || align=right | 2.8 km || 
|-id=487 bgcolor=#fefefe
| 324487 ||  || — || October 21, 2006 || Catalina || CSS || NYS || align=right data-sort-value="0.79" | 790 m || 
|-id=488 bgcolor=#E9E9E9
| 324488 ||  || — || October 16, 2006 || Socorro || LINEAR || — || align=right | 1.8 km || 
|-id=489 bgcolor=#E9E9E9
| 324489 ||  || — || October 22, 2006 || Kitt Peak || Spacewatch || — || align=right data-sort-value="0.89" | 890 m || 
|-id=490 bgcolor=#fefefe
| 324490 ||  || — || October 23, 2006 || Kitt Peak || Spacewatch || — || align=right | 1.0 km || 
|-id=491 bgcolor=#fefefe
| 324491 ||  || — || October 23, 2006 || Kitt Peak || Spacewatch || — || align=right data-sort-value="0.87" | 870 m || 
|-id=492 bgcolor=#E9E9E9
| 324492 ||  || — || October 21, 2006 || Palomar || NEAT || — || align=right | 1.6 km || 
|-id=493 bgcolor=#fefefe
| 324493 ||  || — || October 22, 2006 || Kitt Peak || Spacewatch || — || align=right data-sort-value="0.89" | 890 m || 
|-id=494 bgcolor=#E9E9E9
| 324494 ||  || — || October 22, 2006 || Mount Lemmon || Mount Lemmon Survey || — || align=right | 1.6 km || 
|-id=495 bgcolor=#E9E9E9
| 324495 ||  || — || October 27, 2006 || Mount Lemmon || Mount Lemmon Survey || — || align=right | 1.1 km || 
|-id=496 bgcolor=#fefefe
| 324496 ||  || — || October 20, 2006 || Kitt Peak || Spacewatch || — || align=right data-sort-value="0.83" | 830 m || 
|-id=497 bgcolor=#fefefe
| 324497 ||  || — || October 27, 2006 || Mount Lemmon || Mount Lemmon Survey || — || align=right data-sort-value="0.82" | 820 m || 
|-id=498 bgcolor=#E9E9E9
| 324498 ||  || — || October 28, 2006 || Mount Lemmon || Mount Lemmon Survey || — || align=right data-sort-value="0.93" | 930 m || 
|-id=499 bgcolor=#E9E9E9
| 324499 ||  || — || October 28, 2006 || Mount Lemmon || Mount Lemmon Survey || — || align=right | 2.1 km || 
|-id=500 bgcolor=#fefefe
| 324500 ||  || — || October 28, 2006 || Mount Lemmon || Mount Lemmon Survey || — || align=right data-sort-value="0.90" | 900 m || 
|}

324501–324600 

|-bgcolor=#E9E9E9
| 324501 ||  || — || October 28, 2006 || Kitt Peak || Spacewatch || — || align=right data-sort-value="0.96" | 960 m || 
|-id=502 bgcolor=#E9E9E9
| 324502 ||  || — || October 21, 2006 || Kitt Peak || Spacewatch || — || align=right | 1.1 km || 
|-id=503 bgcolor=#fefefe
| 324503 ||  || — || October 21, 2006 || Mount Lemmon || Mount Lemmon Survey || V || align=right data-sort-value="0.85" | 850 m || 
|-id=504 bgcolor=#E9E9E9
| 324504 ||  || — || October 20, 2006 || Kitt Peak || Spacewatch || — || align=right | 1.0 km || 
|-id=505 bgcolor=#E9E9E9
| 324505 ||  || — || October 17, 2006 || Catalina || CSS || KRM || align=right | 2.5 km || 
|-id=506 bgcolor=#E9E9E9
| 324506 ||  || — || November 10, 2006 || Kitt Peak || Spacewatch || — || align=right | 1.4 km || 
|-id=507 bgcolor=#E9E9E9
| 324507 ||  || — || November 9, 2006 || Kitt Peak || Spacewatch || — || align=right | 2.3 km || 
|-id=508 bgcolor=#E9E9E9
| 324508 ||  || — || November 10, 2006 || Kitt Peak || Spacewatch || — || align=right | 1.8 km || 
|-id=509 bgcolor=#fefefe
| 324509 ||  || — || November 11, 2006 || Catalina || CSS || NYS || align=right data-sort-value="0.82" | 820 m || 
|-id=510 bgcolor=#E9E9E9
| 324510 ||  || — || November 11, 2006 || Catalina || CSS || — || align=right | 1.0 km || 
|-id=511 bgcolor=#E9E9E9
| 324511 ||  || — || November 10, 2006 || Kitt Peak || Spacewatch || — || align=right | 1.2 km || 
|-id=512 bgcolor=#fefefe
| 324512 ||  || — || November 9, 2006 || Kitt Peak || Spacewatch || V || align=right data-sort-value="0.97" | 970 m || 
|-id=513 bgcolor=#E9E9E9
| 324513 ||  || — || November 10, 2006 || Kitt Peak || Spacewatch || — || align=right | 1.3 km || 
|-id=514 bgcolor=#E9E9E9
| 324514 ||  || — || November 11, 2006 || Kitt Peak || Spacewatch || — || align=right | 1.1 km || 
|-id=515 bgcolor=#E9E9E9
| 324515 ||  || — || November 11, 2006 || Kitt Peak || Spacewatch || — || align=right data-sort-value="0.90" | 900 m || 
|-id=516 bgcolor=#E9E9E9
| 324516 ||  || — || November 11, 2006 || Kitt Peak || Spacewatch || — || align=right | 1.0 km || 
|-id=517 bgcolor=#E9E9E9
| 324517 ||  || — || November 11, 2006 || Mount Lemmon || Mount Lemmon Survey || — || align=right data-sort-value="0.84" | 840 m || 
|-id=518 bgcolor=#E9E9E9
| 324518 ||  || — || November 11, 2006 || Mount Lemmon || Mount Lemmon Survey || — || align=right data-sort-value="0.90" | 900 m || 
|-id=519 bgcolor=#E9E9E9
| 324519 ||  || — || November 13, 2006 || Kitt Peak || Spacewatch || — || align=right | 1.1 km || 
|-id=520 bgcolor=#E9E9E9
| 324520 ||  || — || November 14, 2006 || Catalina || CSS || — || align=right | 1.5 km || 
|-id=521 bgcolor=#E9E9E9
| 324521 ||  || — || November 15, 2006 || Kitt Peak || Spacewatch || — || align=right | 1.5 km || 
|-id=522 bgcolor=#E9E9E9
| 324522 ||  || — || November 11, 2006 || Kitt Peak || Spacewatch || — || align=right | 2.0 km || 
|-id=523 bgcolor=#E9E9E9
| 324523 ||  || — || November 13, 2006 || Catalina || CSS || — || align=right | 2.3 km || 
|-id=524 bgcolor=#FA8072
| 324524 ||  || — || October 20, 2006 || Mount Lemmon || Mount Lemmon Survey || — || align=right data-sort-value="0.90" | 900 m || 
|-id=525 bgcolor=#E9E9E9
| 324525 ||  || — || November 13, 2006 || Palomar || NEAT || — || align=right | 1.2 km || 
|-id=526 bgcolor=#E9E9E9
| 324526 ||  || — || November 13, 2006 || Kitt Peak || Spacewatch || — || align=right | 1.3 km || 
|-id=527 bgcolor=#E9E9E9
| 324527 ||  || — || November 14, 2006 || Kitt Peak || Spacewatch || — || align=right data-sort-value="0.86" | 860 m || 
|-id=528 bgcolor=#fefefe
| 324528 ||  || — || November 15, 2006 || Kitt Peak || Spacewatch || — || align=right | 1.5 km || 
|-id=529 bgcolor=#E9E9E9
| 324529 ||  || — || November 15, 2006 || Kitt Peak || Spacewatch || — || align=right data-sort-value="0.92" | 920 m || 
|-id=530 bgcolor=#E9E9E9
| 324530 ||  || — || November 15, 2006 || Kitt Peak || Spacewatch || JUN || align=right data-sort-value="0.93" | 930 m || 
|-id=531 bgcolor=#E9E9E9
| 324531 ||  || — || October 28, 2006 || Mount Lemmon || Mount Lemmon Survey || — || align=right data-sort-value="0.97" | 970 m || 
|-id=532 bgcolor=#E9E9E9
| 324532 ||  || — || November 15, 2006 || Catalina || CSS || — || align=right | 1.0 km || 
|-id=533 bgcolor=#E9E9E9
| 324533 ||  || — || November 15, 2006 || Catalina || CSS || — || align=right | 1.4 km || 
|-id=534 bgcolor=#E9E9E9
| 324534 ||  || — || November 11, 2006 || Kitt Peak || Spacewatch || — || align=right | 1.6 km || 
|-id=535 bgcolor=#E9E9E9
| 324535 ||  || — || November 15, 2006 || Catalina || CSS || — || align=right | 1.7 km || 
|-id=536 bgcolor=#E9E9E9
| 324536 ||  || — || November 16, 2006 || Mount Lemmon || Mount Lemmon Survey || — || align=right | 2.2 km || 
|-id=537 bgcolor=#E9E9E9
| 324537 ||  || — || November 16, 2006 || Socorro || LINEAR || — || align=right | 1.4 km || 
|-id=538 bgcolor=#E9E9E9
| 324538 ||  || — || November 16, 2006 || Mount Lemmon || Mount Lemmon Survey || JUN || align=right | 1.1 km || 
|-id=539 bgcolor=#E9E9E9
| 324539 ||  || — || November 17, 2006 || Socorro || LINEAR || — || align=right | 1.1 km || 
|-id=540 bgcolor=#fefefe
| 324540 ||  || — || November 22, 2006 || 7300 Observatory || W. K. Y. Yeung || NYS || align=right data-sort-value="0.87" | 870 m || 
|-id=541 bgcolor=#E9E9E9
| 324541 ||  || — || November 18, 2006 || Mount Lemmon || Mount Lemmon Survey || — || align=right | 1.0 km || 
|-id=542 bgcolor=#fefefe
| 324542 ||  || — || November 16, 2006 || Kitt Peak || Spacewatch || V || align=right data-sort-value="0.91" | 910 m || 
|-id=543 bgcolor=#E9E9E9
| 324543 ||  || — || November 16, 2006 || Mount Lemmon || Mount Lemmon Survey || — || align=right | 1.3 km || 
|-id=544 bgcolor=#E9E9E9
| 324544 ||  || — || November 16, 2006 || Mount Lemmon || Mount Lemmon Survey || — || align=right | 1.5 km || 
|-id=545 bgcolor=#E9E9E9
| 324545 ||  || — || November 16, 2006 || Kitt Peak || Spacewatch || — || align=right | 1.1 km || 
|-id=546 bgcolor=#E9E9E9
| 324546 ||  || — || November 16, 2006 || Kitt Peak || Spacewatch || — || align=right | 1.2 km || 
|-id=547 bgcolor=#E9E9E9
| 324547 ||  || — || November 16, 2006 || Mount Lemmon || Mount Lemmon Survey || — || align=right | 2.0 km || 
|-id=548 bgcolor=#E9E9E9
| 324548 ||  || — || November 16, 2006 || Kitt Peak || Spacewatch || — || align=right | 1.7 km || 
|-id=549 bgcolor=#E9E9E9
| 324549 ||  || — || November 17, 2006 || Mount Lemmon || Mount Lemmon Survey || — || align=right | 1.2 km || 
|-id=550 bgcolor=#E9E9E9
| 324550 ||  || — || November 17, 2006 || Mount Lemmon || Mount Lemmon Survey || — || align=right | 1.3 km || 
|-id=551 bgcolor=#E9E9E9
| 324551 ||  || — || November 17, 2006 || Mount Lemmon || Mount Lemmon Survey || — || align=right | 1.6 km || 
|-id=552 bgcolor=#fefefe
| 324552 ||  || — || November 18, 2006 || Kitt Peak || Spacewatch || — || align=right data-sort-value="0.84" | 840 m || 
|-id=553 bgcolor=#E9E9E9
| 324553 ||  || — || November 18, 2006 || Kitt Peak || Spacewatch || — || align=right | 1.2 km || 
|-id=554 bgcolor=#E9E9E9
| 324554 ||  || — || November 18, 2006 || Kitt Peak || Spacewatch || — || align=right | 1.0 km || 
|-id=555 bgcolor=#E9E9E9
| 324555 ||  || — || November 18, 2006 || Socorro || LINEAR || — || align=right | 2.2 km || 
|-id=556 bgcolor=#E9E9E9
| 324556 ||  || — || November 19, 2006 || Kitt Peak || Spacewatch || — || align=right data-sort-value="0.89" | 890 m || 
|-id=557 bgcolor=#E9E9E9
| 324557 ||  || — || November 19, 2006 || Kitt Peak || Spacewatch || — || align=right | 1.3 km || 
|-id=558 bgcolor=#E9E9E9
| 324558 ||  || — || November 19, 2006 || Kitt Peak || Spacewatch || — || align=right | 1.3 km || 
|-id=559 bgcolor=#E9E9E9
| 324559 ||  || — || November 19, 2006 || Kitt Peak || Spacewatch || MIS || align=right | 2.3 km || 
|-id=560 bgcolor=#fefefe
| 324560 ||  || — || November 19, 2006 || Kitt Peak || Spacewatch || — || align=right | 1.0 km || 
|-id=561 bgcolor=#fefefe
| 324561 ||  || — || November 19, 2006 || Kitt Peak || Spacewatch || FLO || align=right data-sort-value="0.96" | 960 m || 
|-id=562 bgcolor=#fefefe
| 324562 ||  || — || November 20, 2006 || Mount Lemmon || Mount Lemmon Survey || V || align=right data-sort-value="0.67" | 670 m || 
|-id=563 bgcolor=#E9E9E9
| 324563 ||  || — || November 21, 2006 || Mount Lemmon || Mount Lemmon Survey || — || align=right | 1.1 km || 
|-id=564 bgcolor=#fefefe
| 324564 ||  || — || November 17, 2006 || Catalina || CSS || PHO || align=right | 1.7 km || 
|-id=565 bgcolor=#fefefe
| 324565 ||  || — || November 19, 2006 || Kitt Peak || Spacewatch || — || align=right data-sort-value="0.83" | 830 m || 
|-id=566 bgcolor=#E9E9E9
| 324566 ||  || — || November 19, 2006 || Catalina || CSS || — || align=right | 1.2 km || 
|-id=567 bgcolor=#E9E9E9
| 324567 ||  || — || November 20, 2006 || Kitt Peak || Spacewatch || — || align=right | 1.2 km || 
|-id=568 bgcolor=#E9E9E9
| 324568 ||  || — || November 20, 2006 || Kitt Peak || Spacewatch || ADE || align=right | 2.3 km || 
|-id=569 bgcolor=#E9E9E9
| 324569 ||  || — || November 21, 2006 || Mount Lemmon || Mount Lemmon Survey || — || align=right | 1.0 km || 
|-id=570 bgcolor=#fefefe
| 324570 ||  || — || November 22, 2006 || Kitt Peak || Spacewatch || MAS || align=right data-sort-value="0.87" | 870 m || 
|-id=571 bgcolor=#fefefe
| 324571 ||  || — || November 11, 2006 || Kitt Peak || Spacewatch || NYS || align=right data-sort-value="0.87" | 870 m || 
|-id=572 bgcolor=#fefefe
| 324572 ||  || — || November 23, 2006 || Kitt Peak || Spacewatch || NYS || align=right data-sort-value="0.78" | 780 m || 
|-id=573 bgcolor=#E9E9E9
| 324573 ||  || — || November 24, 2006 || Mount Lemmon || Mount Lemmon Survey || — || align=right data-sort-value="0.95" | 950 m || 
|-id=574 bgcolor=#E9E9E9
| 324574 ||  || — || November 25, 2006 || Kitt Peak || Spacewatch || — || align=right | 1.7 km || 
|-id=575 bgcolor=#E9E9E9
| 324575 ||  || — || November 27, 2006 || Mount Lemmon || Mount Lemmon Survey || — || align=right | 1.8 km || 
|-id=576 bgcolor=#E9E9E9
| 324576 ||  || — || November 27, 2006 || Kitt Peak || Spacewatch || — || align=right | 2.2 km || 
|-id=577 bgcolor=#E9E9E9
| 324577 ||  || — || November 16, 2006 || Mount Lemmon || Mount Lemmon Survey || — || align=right | 3.3 km || 
|-id=578 bgcolor=#E9E9E9
| 324578 ||  || — || November 27, 2006 || Mount Lemmon || Mount Lemmon Survey || WIT || align=right | 1.1 km || 
|-id=579 bgcolor=#E9E9E9
| 324579 ||  || — || November 18, 2006 || Mount Lemmon || Mount Lemmon Survey || — || align=right | 1.9 km || 
|-id=580 bgcolor=#E9E9E9
| 324580 ||  || — || November 22, 2006 || Mount Lemmon || Mount Lemmon Survey || — || align=right | 2.2 km || 
|-id=581 bgcolor=#E9E9E9
| 324581 || 2006 XC || — || December 8, 2006 || Sandlot || Sandlot Obs. || — || align=right | 1.3 km || 
|-id=582 bgcolor=#FA8072
| 324582 ||  || — || December 9, 2006 || Socorro || LINEAR || — || align=right | 2.9 km || 
|-id=583 bgcolor=#fefefe
| 324583 ||  || — || December 9, 2006 || 7300 || W. K. Y. Yeung || — || align=right | 1.3 km || 
|-id=584 bgcolor=#E9E9E9
| 324584 ||  || — || December 10, 2006 || Kitt Peak || Spacewatch || — || align=right | 1.9 km || 
|-id=585 bgcolor=#E9E9E9
| 324585 ||  || — || November 16, 2006 || Kitt Peak || Spacewatch || — || align=right | 1.1 km || 
|-id=586 bgcolor=#E9E9E9
| 324586 ||  || — || November 18, 2006 || Socorro || LINEAR || — || align=right | 1.4 km || 
|-id=587 bgcolor=#E9E9E9
| 324587 ||  || — || December 10, 2006 || Kitt Peak || Spacewatch || — || align=right | 1.2 km || 
|-id=588 bgcolor=#E9E9E9
| 324588 ||  || — || December 10, 2006 || Kitt Peak || Spacewatch || — || align=right | 1.2 km || 
|-id=589 bgcolor=#E9E9E9
| 324589 ||  || — || December 11, 2006 || Kitt Peak || Spacewatch || — || align=right | 1.5 km || 
|-id=590 bgcolor=#E9E9E9
| 324590 ||  || — || December 11, 2006 || Kitt Peak || Spacewatch || — || align=right | 1.6 km || 
|-id=591 bgcolor=#E9E9E9
| 324591 ||  || — || December 12, 2006 || Kitt Peak || Spacewatch || — || align=right | 2.0 km || 
|-id=592 bgcolor=#E9E9E9
| 324592 ||  || — || December 11, 2006 || Kitt Peak || Spacewatch || — || align=right | 1.7 km || 
|-id=593 bgcolor=#E9E9E9
| 324593 ||  || — || December 13, 2006 || Socorro || LINEAR || JUN || align=right | 1.2 km || 
|-id=594 bgcolor=#E9E9E9
| 324594 ||  || — || December 13, 2006 || Kitt Peak || Spacewatch || EUN || align=right | 1.7 km || 
|-id=595 bgcolor=#E9E9E9
| 324595 ||  || — || December 14, 2006 || Socorro || LINEAR || GAL || align=right | 2.3 km || 
|-id=596 bgcolor=#E9E9E9
| 324596 ||  || — || December 15, 2006 || Socorro || LINEAR || — || align=right | 2.9 km || 
|-id=597 bgcolor=#E9E9E9
| 324597 ||  || — || December 1, 2006 || Mount Lemmon || Mount Lemmon Survey || — || align=right | 1.6 km || 
|-id=598 bgcolor=#E9E9E9
| 324598 ||  || — || December 14, 2006 || Kitt Peak || Spacewatch || — || align=right | 1.9 km || 
|-id=599 bgcolor=#E9E9E9
| 324599 ||  || — || December 15, 2006 || Mount Lemmon || Mount Lemmon Survey || — || align=right | 2.9 km || 
|-id=600 bgcolor=#fefefe
| 324600 ||  || — || December 12, 2006 || Palomar || NEAT || V || align=right | 1.2 km || 
|}

324601–324700 

|-bgcolor=#E9E9E9
| 324601 ||  || — || December 13, 2006 || Socorro || LINEAR || — || align=right | 1.5 km || 
|-id=602 bgcolor=#E9E9E9
| 324602 ||  || — || December 17, 2006 || 7300 || W. K. Y. Yeung || — || align=right | 1.7 km || 
|-id=603 bgcolor=#E9E9E9
| 324603 ||  || — || December 20, 2006 || Mount Lemmon || Mount Lemmon Survey || — || align=right | 1.1 km || 
|-id=604 bgcolor=#E9E9E9
| 324604 ||  || — || December 20, 2006 || Mount Lemmon || Mount Lemmon Survey || MAR || align=right | 1.9 km || 
|-id=605 bgcolor=#E9E9E9
| 324605 ||  || — || December 20, 2006 || Mount Lemmon || Mount Lemmon Survey || — || align=right | 2.3 km || 
|-id=606 bgcolor=#d6d6d6
| 324606 ||  || — || August 30, 2005 || Campo Imperatore || CINEOS || KOR || align=right | 1.7 km || 
|-id=607 bgcolor=#E9E9E9
| 324607 ||  || — || December 21, 2006 || Palomar || NEAT || — || align=right | 1.8 km || 
|-id=608 bgcolor=#E9E9E9
| 324608 ||  || — || December 11, 2006 || Kitt Peak || Spacewatch || — || align=right | 1.5 km || 
|-id=609 bgcolor=#E9E9E9
| 324609 ||  || — || November 21, 2006 || Mount Lemmon || Mount Lemmon Survey || WIT || align=right | 1.1 km || 
|-id=610 bgcolor=#E9E9E9
| 324610 ||  || — || December 21, 2006 || Kitt Peak || Spacewatch || RAF || align=right data-sort-value="0.79" | 790 m || 
|-id=611 bgcolor=#E9E9E9
| 324611 ||  || — || December 21, 2006 || Kitt Peak || Spacewatch || — || align=right | 2.1 km || 
|-id=612 bgcolor=#E9E9E9
| 324612 ||  || — || December 9, 2006 || Kitt Peak || Spacewatch || — || align=right | 1.5 km || 
|-id=613 bgcolor=#E9E9E9
| 324613 ||  || — || December 21, 2006 || Kitt Peak || Spacewatch || — || align=right | 1.9 km || 
|-id=614 bgcolor=#E9E9E9
| 324614 ||  || — || December 21, 2006 || Kitt Peak || Spacewatch || — || align=right | 2.5 km || 
|-id=615 bgcolor=#E9E9E9
| 324615 ||  || — || December 21, 2006 || Kitt Peak || Spacewatch || — || align=right | 1.7 km || 
|-id=616 bgcolor=#E9E9E9
| 324616 ||  || — || December 21, 2006 || Kitt Peak || Spacewatch || — || align=right | 1.4 km || 
|-id=617 bgcolor=#E9E9E9
| 324617 ||  || — || December 21, 2006 || Kitt Peak || Spacewatch || — || align=right | 2.0 km || 
|-id=618 bgcolor=#E9E9E9
| 324618 ||  || — || December 21, 2006 || Kitt Peak || Spacewatch || — || align=right | 2.8 km || 
|-id=619 bgcolor=#fefefe
| 324619 ||  || — || December 17, 2006 || Mount Lemmon || Mount Lemmon Survey || — || align=right | 1.0 km || 
|-id=620 bgcolor=#E9E9E9
| 324620 ||  || — || January 8, 2007 || Mount Lemmon || Mount Lemmon Survey || — || align=right | 2.0 km || 
|-id=621 bgcolor=#E9E9E9
| 324621 ||  || — || January 9, 2007 || Mount Lemmon || Mount Lemmon Survey || — || align=right | 2.2 km || 
|-id=622 bgcolor=#E9E9E9
| 324622 ||  || — || January 10, 2007 || Socorro || LINEAR || — || align=right | 2.3 km || 
|-id=623 bgcolor=#E9E9E9
| 324623 ||  || — || January 15, 2007 || Catalina || CSS || — || align=right | 1.7 km || 
|-id=624 bgcolor=#E9E9E9
| 324624 ||  || — || November 15, 2006 || Mount Lemmon || Mount Lemmon Survey || INO || align=right | 1.9 km || 
|-id=625 bgcolor=#E9E9E9
| 324625 ||  || — || January 10, 2007 || Mount Lemmon || Mount Lemmon Survey || AGN || align=right | 1.5 km || 
|-id=626 bgcolor=#E9E9E9
| 324626 ||  || — || January 17, 2007 || Palomar || NEAT || — || align=right | 3.2 km || 
|-id=627 bgcolor=#d6d6d6
| 324627 ||  || — || January 17, 2007 || Palomar || NEAT || EUP || align=right | 3.9 km || 
|-id=628 bgcolor=#E9E9E9
| 324628 ||  || — || January 17, 2007 || Mount Lemmon || Mount Lemmon Survey || — || align=right | 3.3 km || 
|-id=629 bgcolor=#E9E9E9
| 324629 ||  || — || January 17, 2007 || Kitt Peak || Spacewatch || — || align=right | 2.4 km || 
|-id=630 bgcolor=#E9E9E9
| 324630 ||  || — || January 17, 2007 || Kitt Peak || Spacewatch || NEM || align=right | 2.7 km || 
|-id=631 bgcolor=#E9E9E9
| 324631 ||  || — || January 17, 2007 || Kitt Peak || Spacewatch || — || align=right | 1.8 km || 
|-id=632 bgcolor=#E9E9E9
| 324632 ||  || — || January 24, 2007 || Catalina || CSS || — || align=right | 3.8 km || 
|-id=633 bgcolor=#E9E9E9
| 324633 ||  || — || January 24, 2007 || Catalina || CSS || — || align=right | 2.9 km || 
|-id=634 bgcolor=#E9E9E9
| 324634 ||  || — || January 24, 2007 || Catalina || CSS || NEM || align=right | 2.6 km || 
|-id=635 bgcolor=#E9E9E9
| 324635 ||  || — || January 24, 2007 || Mount Lemmon || Mount Lemmon Survey || MIS || align=right | 2.8 km || 
|-id=636 bgcolor=#E9E9E9
| 324636 ||  || — || January 24, 2007 || Mount Lemmon || Mount Lemmon Survey || — || align=right | 2.0 km || 
|-id=637 bgcolor=#E9E9E9
| 324637 ||  || — || January 24, 2007 || Mount Lemmon || Mount Lemmon Survey || GEF || align=right | 1.1 km || 
|-id=638 bgcolor=#E9E9E9
| 324638 ||  || — || January 26, 2007 || Kitt Peak || Spacewatch || AEO || align=right | 1.2 km || 
|-id=639 bgcolor=#E9E9E9
| 324639 ||  || — || January 27, 2007 || Mount Lemmon || Mount Lemmon Survey || — || align=right | 2.4 km || 
|-id=640 bgcolor=#E9E9E9
| 324640 ||  || — || November 3, 2005 || Kitt Peak || Spacewatch || — || align=right | 2.7 km || 
|-id=641 bgcolor=#E9E9E9
| 324641 ||  || — || January 17, 2007 || Kitt Peak || Spacewatch || EUN || align=right | 1.4 km || 
|-id=642 bgcolor=#E9E9E9
| 324642 ||  || — || January 28, 2007 || Mount Lemmon || Mount Lemmon Survey || — || align=right | 2.7 km || 
|-id=643 bgcolor=#E9E9E9
| 324643 ||  || — || January 17, 2007 || Catalina || CSS || — || align=right | 2.7 km || 
|-id=644 bgcolor=#E9E9E9
| 324644 ||  || — || February 6, 2007 || Kitt Peak || Spacewatch || GAL || align=right | 2.0 km || 
|-id=645 bgcolor=#E9E9E9
| 324645 ||  || — || February 6, 2007 || Mount Lemmon || Mount Lemmon Survey || NEM || align=right | 2.6 km || 
|-id=646 bgcolor=#E9E9E9
| 324646 ||  || — || February 5, 2007 || Palomar || NEAT || — || align=right | 2.8 km || 
|-id=647 bgcolor=#E9E9E9
| 324647 ||  || — || February 6, 2007 || Mount Lemmon || Mount Lemmon Survey || — || align=right | 1.6 km || 
|-id=648 bgcolor=#E9E9E9
| 324648 ||  || — || April 4, 2003 || Kitt Peak || Spacewatch || AGN || align=right | 1.6 km || 
|-id=649 bgcolor=#E9E9E9
| 324649 ||  || — || February 8, 2007 || Mount Lemmon || Mount Lemmon Survey || GEF || align=right | 1.7 km || 
|-id=650 bgcolor=#E9E9E9
| 324650 ||  || — || February 6, 2007 || Kitt Peak || Spacewatch || — || align=right | 2.5 km || 
|-id=651 bgcolor=#E9E9E9
| 324651 ||  || — || April 5, 2003 || Kitt Peak || Spacewatch || HOF || align=right | 2.5 km || 
|-id=652 bgcolor=#E9E9E9
| 324652 ||  || — || February 6, 2007 || Mount Lemmon || Mount Lemmon Survey || HOF || align=right | 2.6 km || 
|-id=653 bgcolor=#E9E9E9
| 324653 ||  || — || November 22, 2006 || Mount Lemmon || Mount Lemmon Survey || DOR || align=right | 2.6 km || 
|-id=654 bgcolor=#E9E9E9
| 324654 ||  || — || February 6, 2007 || Kitt Peak || Spacewatch || — || align=right | 3.3 km || 
|-id=655 bgcolor=#E9E9E9
| 324655 ||  || — || February 8, 2007 || Palomar || NEAT || — || align=right | 3.0 km || 
|-id=656 bgcolor=#E9E9E9
| 324656 ||  || — || February 10, 2007 || Catalina || CSS || — || align=right | 2.6 km || 
|-id=657 bgcolor=#E9E9E9
| 324657 ||  || — || November 28, 2006 || Mount Lemmon || Mount Lemmon Survey || — || align=right | 1.9 km || 
|-id=658 bgcolor=#E9E9E9
| 324658 ||  || — || February 15, 2007 || Palomar || NEAT || — || align=right | 2.9 km || 
|-id=659 bgcolor=#E9E9E9
| 324659 ||  || — || February 6, 2007 || Kitt Peak || Spacewatch || — || align=right | 2.5 km || 
|-id=660 bgcolor=#E9E9E9
| 324660 ||  || — || February 18, 2007 || Mayhill || A. Lowe || — || align=right | 3.4 km || 
|-id=661 bgcolor=#E9E9E9
| 324661 ||  || — || January 25, 2007 || Kitt Peak || Spacewatch || EUN || align=right | 1.5 km || 
|-id=662 bgcolor=#E9E9E9
| 324662 ||  || — || December 24, 2006 || Mount Lemmon || Mount Lemmon Survey || — || align=right | 2.6 km || 
|-id=663 bgcolor=#E9E9E9
| 324663 ||  || — || February 17, 2007 || Kitt Peak || Spacewatch || — || align=right | 1.7 km || 
|-id=664 bgcolor=#E9E9E9
| 324664 ||  || — || February 17, 2007 || Kitt Peak || Spacewatch || — || align=right | 2.6 km || 
|-id=665 bgcolor=#E9E9E9
| 324665 ||  || — || February 17, 2007 || Kitt Peak || Spacewatch || — || align=right | 2.6 km || 
|-id=666 bgcolor=#d6d6d6
| 324666 ||  || — || September 12, 2004 || Kitt Peak || Spacewatch || — || align=right | 2.7 km || 
|-id=667 bgcolor=#d6d6d6
| 324667 ||  || — || February 17, 2007 || Kitt Peak || Spacewatch || — || align=right | 2.9 km || 
|-id=668 bgcolor=#d6d6d6
| 324668 ||  || — || February 17, 2007 || Kitt Peak || Spacewatch || CHA || align=right | 2.0 km || 
|-id=669 bgcolor=#E9E9E9
| 324669 ||  || — || February 19, 2007 || Kitt Peak || Spacewatch || — || align=right | 1.7 km || 
|-id=670 bgcolor=#E9E9E9
| 324670 ||  || — || February 21, 2007 || Mount Lemmon || Mount Lemmon Survey || — || align=right | 2.9 km || 
|-id=671 bgcolor=#d6d6d6
| 324671 ||  || — || November 22, 2005 || Kitt Peak || Spacewatch || KOR || align=right | 1.4 km || 
|-id=672 bgcolor=#E9E9E9
| 324672 ||  || — || February 22, 2007 || Kitt Peak || Spacewatch || — || align=right | 1.7 km || 
|-id=673 bgcolor=#E9E9E9
| 324673 ||  || — || January 26, 2007 || Kitt Peak || Spacewatch || GEF || align=right | 1.4 km || 
|-id=674 bgcolor=#d6d6d6
| 324674 ||  || — || February 21, 2007 || Kitt Peak || Spacewatch || KOR || align=right | 1.2 km || 
|-id=675 bgcolor=#E9E9E9
| 324675 ||  || — || February 21, 2007 || Kitt Peak || Spacewatch || AGN || align=right | 1.2 km || 
|-id=676 bgcolor=#E9E9E9
| 324676 ||  || — || February 23, 2007 || Kitt Peak || Spacewatch || NEM || align=right | 2.6 km || 
|-id=677 bgcolor=#d6d6d6
| 324677 ||  || — || February 25, 2007 || Mount Lemmon || Mount Lemmon Survey || — || align=right | 4.0 km || 
|-id=678 bgcolor=#E9E9E9
| 324678 ||  || — || February 23, 2007 || Socorro || LINEAR || — || align=right | 2.7 km || 
|-id=679 bgcolor=#E9E9E9
| 324679 ||  || — || February 23, 2007 || Kitt Peak || Spacewatch || — || align=right | 2.6 km || 
|-id=680 bgcolor=#E9E9E9
| 324680 ||  || — || January 27, 2007 || Kitt Peak || Spacewatch || — || align=right | 2.2 km || 
|-id=681 bgcolor=#E9E9E9
| 324681 ||  || — || February 16, 2007 || Mount Lemmon || Mount Lemmon Survey || — || align=right | 2.3 km || 
|-id=682 bgcolor=#d6d6d6
| 324682 ||  || — || February 23, 2007 || Kitt Peak || Spacewatch || KAR || align=right | 1.4 km || 
|-id=683 bgcolor=#d6d6d6
| 324683 ||  || — || February 21, 2007 || Mount Lemmon || Mount Lemmon Survey || 628 || align=right | 2.4 km || 
|-id=684 bgcolor=#d6d6d6
| 324684 ||  || — || March 9, 2007 || Kitt Peak || Spacewatch || KOR || align=right | 1.4 km || 
|-id=685 bgcolor=#d6d6d6
| 324685 ||  || — || March 9, 2007 || Kitt Peak || Spacewatch || KOR || align=right | 1.5 km || 
|-id=686 bgcolor=#d6d6d6
| 324686 ||  || — || March 9, 2007 || Mount Lemmon || Mount Lemmon Survey || KOR || align=right | 1.6 km || 
|-id=687 bgcolor=#d6d6d6
| 324687 ||  || — || December 25, 2005 || Kitt Peak || Spacewatch || THM || align=right | 2.3 km || 
|-id=688 bgcolor=#E9E9E9
| 324688 ||  || — || March 6, 2007 || Palomar || NEAT || — || align=right | 2.4 km || 
|-id=689 bgcolor=#d6d6d6
| 324689 ||  || — || March 9, 2007 || Kitt Peak || Spacewatch || 627 || align=right | 2.8 km || 
|-id=690 bgcolor=#d6d6d6
| 324690 ||  || — || March 9, 2007 || Kitt Peak || Spacewatch || — || align=right | 2.8 km || 
|-id=691 bgcolor=#d6d6d6
| 324691 ||  || — || February 21, 2007 || Mount Lemmon || Mount Lemmon Survey || — || align=right | 2.3 km || 
|-id=692 bgcolor=#E9E9E9
| 324692 ||  || — || March 9, 2007 || Mount Lemmon || Mount Lemmon Survey || — || align=right | 2.6 km || 
|-id=693 bgcolor=#d6d6d6
| 324693 ||  || — || March 11, 2007 || Kitt Peak || Spacewatch || — || align=right | 2.5 km || 
|-id=694 bgcolor=#d6d6d6
| 324694 ||  || — || March 9, 2007 || Kitt Peak || Spacewatch || — || align=right | 3.1 km || 
|-id=695 bgcolor=#E9E9E9
| 324695 ||  || — || March 9, 2007 || Kitt Peak || Spacewatch || — || align=right | 2.8 km || 
|-id=696 bgcolor=#d6d6d6
| 324696 ||  || — || March 9, 2007 || Mount Lemmon || Mount Lemmon Survey || — || align=right | 3.2 km || 
|-id=697 bgcolor=#d6d6d6
| 324697 ||  || — || March 9, 2007 || Kitt Peak || Spacewatch || — || align=right | 3.1 km || 
|-id=698 bgcolor=#d6d6d6
| 324698 ||  || — || March 12, 2007 || Kitt Peak || Spacewatch || EOS || align=right | 1.7 km || 
|-id=699 bgcolor=#d6d6d6
| 324699 ||  || — || March 10, 2007 || Kitt Peak || Spacewatch || — || align=right | 3.9 km || 
|-id=700 bgcolor=#E9E9E9
| 324700 ||  || — || March 10, 2007 || Palomar || NEAT || — || align=right | 3.5 km || 
|}

324701–324800 

|-bgcolor=#d6d6d6
| 324701 ||  || — || March 10, 2007 || Kitt Peak || Spacewatch || — || align=right | 3.6 km || 
|-id=702 bgcolor=#E9E9E9
| 324702 ||  || — || March 11, 2007 || Kitt Peak || Spacewatch || — || align=right | 2.8 km || 
|-id=703 bgcolor=#E9E9E9
| 324703 ||  || — || March 11, 2007 || Catalina || CSS || — || align=right | 3.2 km || 
|-id=704 bgcolor=#d6d6d6
| 324704 ||  || — || March 11, 2007 || Kitt Peak || Spacewatch || — || align=right | 3.6 km || 
|-id=705 bgcolor=#d6d6d6
| 324705 ||  || — || March 11, 2007 || Kitt Peak || Spacewatch || KOR || align=right | 1.7 km || 
|-id=706 bgcolor=#d6d6d6
| 324706 ||  || — || February 26, 2007 || Mount Lemmon || Mount Lemmon Survey || — || align=right | 2.4 km || 
|-id=707 bgcolor=#d6d6d6
| 324707 ||  || — || March 11, 2007 || Kitt Peak || Spacewatch || — || align=right | 3.3 km || 
|-id=708 bgcolor=#d6d6d6
| 324708 ||  || — || March 13, 2007 || Mount Lemmon || Mount Lemmon Survey || VER || align=right | 3.5 km || 
|-id=709 bgcolor=#d6d6d6
| 324709 ||  || — || March 13, 2007 || Mount Lemmon || Mount Lemmon Survey || — || align=right | 2.7 km || 
|-id=710 bgcolor=#E9E9E9
| 324710 ||  || — || March 9, 2007 || Kitt Peak || Spacewatch || MRX || align=right data-sort-value="0.92" | 920 m || 
|-id=711 bgcolor=#d6d6d6
| 324711 ||  || — || March 9, 2007 || Mount Lemmon || Mount Lemmon Survey || KOR || align=right | 1.4 km || 
|-id=712 bgcolor=#d6d6d6
| 324712 ||  || — || March 9, 2007 || Mount Lemmon || Mount Lemmon Survey || — || align=right | 2.3 km || 
|-id=713 bgcolor=#E9E9E9
| 324713 ||  || — || March 9, 2007 || Mount Lemmon || Mount Lemmon Survey || MRX || align=right | 1.5 km || 
|-id=714 bgcolor=#d6d6d6
| 324714 ||  || — || March 9, 2007 || Mount Lemmon || Mount Lemmon Survey || — || align=right | 2.7 km || 
|-id=715 bgcolor=#E9E9E9
| 324715 ||  || — || March 9, 2007 || Mount Lemmon || Mount Lemmon Survey || — || align=right | 2.7 km || 
|-id=716 bgcolor=#d6d6d6
| 324716 ||  || — || March 10, 2007 || Mount Lemmon || Mount Lemmon Survey || KAR || align=right | 1.1 km || 
|-id=717 bgcolor=#d6d6d6
| 324717 ||  || — || March 10, 2007 || Mount Lemmon || Mount Lemmon Survey || KOR || align=right | 1.3 km || 
|-id=718 bgcolor=#E9E9E9
| 324718 ||  || — || March 12, 2007 || Kitt Peak || Spacewatch || — || align=right | 2.4 km || 
|-id=719 bgcolor=#d6d6d6
| 324719 ||  || — || March 12, 2007 || Kitt Peak || Spacewatch || — || align=right | 2.7 km || 
|-id=720 bgcolor=#d6d6d6
| 324720 ||  || — || March 12, 2007 || Mount Lemmon || Mount Lemmon Survey || — || align=right | 2.5 km || 
|-id=721 bgcolor=#d6d6d6
| 324721 ||  || — || February 26, 2007 || Mount Lemmon || Mount Lemmon Survey || EOS || align=right | 1.8 km || 
|-id=722 bgcolor=#d6d6d6
| 324722 ||  || — || March 12, 2007 || Mount Lemmon || Mount Lemmon Survey || KOR || align=right | 1.2 km || 
|-id=723 bgcolor=#d6d6d6
| 324723 ||  || — || March 12, 2007 || Mount Lemmon || Mount Lemmon Survey || — || align=right | 3.5 km || 
|-id=724 bgcolor=#d6d6d6
| 324724 ||  || — || March 12, 2007 || Mount Lemmon || Mount Lemmon Survey || KOR || align=right | 1.7 km || 
|-id=725 bgcolor=#d6d6d6
| 324725 ||  || — || March 12, 2007 || Kitt Peak || Spacewatch || KOR || align=right | 1.6 km || 
|-id=726 bgcolor=#d6d6d6
| 324726 ||  || — || March 15, 2007 || Mount Lemmon || Mount Lemmon Survey || — || align=right | 3.3 km || 
|-id=727 bgcolor=#E9E9E9
| 324727 ||  || — || March 11, 2007 || Mount Lemmon || Mount Lemmon Survey || — || align=right | 2.6 km || 
|-id=728 bgcolor=#d6d6d6
| 324728 ||  || — || March 13, 2007 || Kitt Peak || Spacewatch || — || align=right | 2.9 km || 
|-id=729 bgcolor=#E9E9E9
| 324729 ||  || — || March 15, 2007 || Kitt Peak || Spacewatch || — || align=right | 2.6 km || 
|-id=730 bgcolor=#E9E9E9
| 324730 ||  || — || March 15, 2007 || Catalina || CSS || — || align=right | 3.4 km || 
|-id=731 bgcolor=#d6d6d6
| 324731 ||  || — || March 11, 2007 || Mount Lemmon || Mount Lemmon Survey || EOS || align=right | 2.6 km || 
|-id=732 bgcolor=#d6d6d6
| 324732 ||  || — || March 14, 2007 || Kitt Peak || Spacewatch || EUP || align=right | 4.7 km || 
|-id=733 bgcolor=#d6d6d6
| 324733 ||  || — || March 14, 2007 || Mount Lemmon || Mount Lemmon Survey || — || align=right | 3.3 km || 
|-id=734 bgcolor=#d6d6d6
| 324734 ||  || — || March 14, 2007 || Kitt Peak || Spacewatch || — || align=right | 4.2 km || 
|-id=735 bgcolor=#d6d6d6
| 324735 ||  || — || March 15, 2007 || Mount Lemmon || Mount Lemmon Survey || — || align=right | 5.0 km || 
|-id=736 bgcolor=#d6d6d6
| 324736 ||  || — || February 25, 2007 || Mount Lemmon || Mount Lemmon Survey || EOS || align=right | 2.1 km || 
|-id=737 bgcolor=#d6d6d6
| 324737 ||  || — || March 13, 2007 || Kitt Peak || Spacewatch || — || align=right | 3.4 km || 
|-id=738 bgcolor=#d6d6d6
| 324738 ||  || — || March 10, 2007 || Kitt Peak || Spacewatch || HYG || align=right | 2.8 km || 
|-id=739 bgcolor=#d6d6d6
| 324739 ||  || — || March 15, 2007 || Kitt Peak || Spacewatch || — || align=right | 2.6 km || 
|-id=740 bgcolor=#d6d6d6
| 324740 ||  || — || March 9, 2007 || Mount Lemmon || Mount Lemmon Survey || — || align=right | 2.3 km || 
|-id=741 bgcolor=#E9E9E9
| 324741 ||  || — || March 8, 2007 || Palomar || NEAT || GAL || align=right | 2.0 km || 
|-id=742 bgcolor=#E9E9E9
| 324742 ||  || — || March 10, 2007 || Kitt Peak || Spacewatch || — || align=right | 3.1 km || 
|-id=743 bgcolor=#d6d6d6
| 324743 ||  || — || March 11, 2007 || Mount Lemmon || Mount Lemmon Survey || — || align=right | 3.6 km || 
|-id=744 bgcolor=#d6d6d6
| 324744 ||  || — || March 15, 2007 || Mount Lemmon || Mount Lemmon Survey || — || align=right | 3.7 km || 
|-id=745 bgcolor=#d6d6d6
| 324745 ||  || — || March 14, 2007 || Siding Spring || SSS || — || align=right | 4.1 km || 
|-id=746 bgcolor=#d6d6d6
| 324746 ||  || — || March 14, 2007 || Kitt Peak || Spacewatch || — || align=right | 2.3 km || 
|-id=747 bgcolor=#d6d6d6
| 324747 ||  || — || March 16, 2007 || Mount Lemmon || Mount Lemmon Survey || — || align=right | 2.4 km || 
|-id=748 bgcolor=#d6d6d6
| 324748 ||  || — || March 20, 2007 || Kitt Peak || Spacewatch || — || align=right | 2.3 km || 
|-id=749 bgcolor=#d6d6d6
| 324749 ||  || — || March 20, 2007 || Mount Lemmon || Mount Lemmon Survey || — || align=right | 2.6 km || 
|-id=750 bgcolor=#d6d6d6
| 324750 ||  || — || March 20, 2007 || Kitt Peak || Spacewatch || 637 || align=right | 2.9 km || 
|-id=751 bgcolor=#d6d6d6
| 324751 ||  || — || March 21, 2007 || Socorro || LINEAR || — || align=right | 3.8 km || 
|-id=752 bgcolor=#d6d6d6
| 324752 ||  || — || March 9, 2007 || Kitt Peak || Spacewatch || — || align=right | 3.6 km || 
|-id=753 bgcolor=#d6d6d6
| 324753 ||  || — || March 20, 2007 || Mount Lemmon || Mount Lemmon Survey || — || align=right | 2.7 km || 
|-id=754 bgcolor=#d6d6d6
| 324754 ||  || — || March 26, 2007 || Mount Lemmon || Mount Lemmon Survey || VER || align=right | 3.2 km || 
|-id=755 bgcolor=#d6d6d6
| 324755 ||  || — || March 26, 2007 || Mount Lemmon || Mount Lemmon Survey || EOS || align=right | 2.2 km || 
|-id=756 bgcolor=#d6d6d6
| 324756 ||  || — || March 26, 2007 || Catalina || CSS || IMH || align=right | 4.2 km || 
|-id=757 bgcolor=#d6d6d6
| 324757 ||  || — || April 6, 2007 || Antares || ARO || — || align=right | 3.4 km || 
|-id=758 bgcolor=#E9E9E9
| 324758 ||  || — || April 11, 2007 || Bergisch Gladbach || W. Bickel || WIT || align=right | 1.4 km || 
|-id=759 bgcolor=#d6d6d6
| 324759 ||  || — || April 11, 2007 || Mount Lemmon || Mount Lemmon Survey || — || align=right | 2.9 km || 
|-id=760 bgcolor=#d6d6d6
| 324760 ||  || — || April 11, 2007 || Kitt Peak || Spacewatch || — || align=right | 2.9 km || 
|-id=761 bgcolor=#d6d6d6
| 324761 ||  || — || April 11, 2007 || Kitt Peak || Spacewatch || — || align=right | 2.9 km || 
|-id=762 bgcolor=#d6d6d6
| 324762 ||  || — || April 11, 2007 || Kitt Peak || Spacewatch || — || align=right | 3.1 km || 
|-id=763 bgcolor=#d6d6d6
| 324763 ||  || — || March 28, 2007 || Siding Spring || SSS || — || align=right | 4.8 km || 
|-id=764 bgcolor=#E9E9E9
| 324764 ||  || — || April 11, 2007 || Mount Lemmon || Mount Lemmon Survey || — || align=right | 1.9 km || 
|-id=765 bgcolor=#d6d6d6
| 324765 ||  || — || April 11, 2007 || Mount Lemmon || Mount Lemmon Survey || — || align=right | 2.7 km || 
|-id=766 bgcolor=#d6d6d6
| 324766 ||  || — || April 11, 2007 || Mount Lemmon || Mount Lemmon Survey || HYG || align=right | 3.5 km || 
|-id=767 bgcolor=#d6d6d6
| 324767 ||  || — || April 14, 2007 || Kitt Peak || Spacewatch || — || align=right | 2.7 km || 
|-id=768 bgcolor=#d6d6d6
| 324768 ||  || — || April 14, 2007 || Kitt Peak || Spacewatch || — || align=right | 3.5 km || 
|-id=769 bgcolor=#d6d6d6
| 324769 ||  || — || April 14, 2007 || Kitt Peak || Spacewatch || — || align=right | 2.3 km || 
|-id=770 bgcolor=#d6d6d6
| 324770 ||  || — || April 14, 2007 || Kitt Peak || Spacewatch || — || align=right | 3.0 km || 
|-id=771 bgcolor=#d6d6d6
| 324771 ||  || — || April 14, 2007 || Kitt Peak || Spacewatch || — || align=right | 2.8 km || 
|-id=772 bgcolor=#d6d6d6
| 324772 ||  || — || April 14, 2007 || Kitt Peak || Spacewatch || HYG || align=right | 2.8 km || 
|-id=773 bgcolor=#d6d6d6
| 324773 ||  || — || April 14, 2007 || Kitt Peak || Spacewatch || URS || align=right | 3.9 km || 
|-id=774 bgcolor=#d6d6d6
| 324774 ||  || — || April 14, 2007 || Kitt Peak || Spacewatch || — || align=right | 3.5 km || 
|-id=775 bgcolor=#d6d6d6
| 324775 ||  || — || April 14, 2007 || Kitt Peak || Spacewatch || — || align=right | 4.9 km || 
|-id=776 bgcolor=#d6d6d6
| 324776 ||  || — || April 14, 2007 || Mount Lemmon || Mount Lemmon Survey || — || align=right | 4.5 km || 
|-id=777 bgcolor=#d6d6d6
| 324777 ||  || — || April 15, 2007 || Kitt Peak || Spacewatch || — || align=right | 3.3 km || 
|-id=778 bgcolor=#d6d6d6
| 324778 ||  || — || April 14, 2007 || Mount Lemmon || Mount Lemmon Survey || — || align=right | 3.3 km || 
|-id=779 bgcolor=#d6d6d6
| 324779 ||  || — || April 15, 2007 || Kitt Peak || Spacewatch || — || align=right | 3.1 km || 
|-id=780 bgcolor=#d6d6d6
| 324780 ||  || — || April 15, 2007 || Kitt Peak || Spacewatch || — || align=right | 2.8 km || 
|-id=781 bgcolor=#d6d6d6
| 324781 ||  || — || April 15, 2007 || Mount Lemmon || Mount Lemmon Survey || — || align=right | 2.7 km || 
|-id=782 bgcolor=#d6d6d6
| 324782 ||  || — || April 15, 2007 || Kitt Peak || Spacewatch || — || align=right | 3.9 km || 
|-id=783 bgcolor=#d6d6d6
| 324783 ||  || — || October 7, 2004 || Kitt Peak || Spacewatch || — || align=right | 4.1 km || 
|-id=784 bgcolor=#d6d6d6
| 324784 ||  || — || April 15, 2007 || Kitt Peak || Spacewatch || EOS || align=right | 2.4 km || 
|-id=785 bgcolor=#d6d6d6
| 324785 ||  || — || April 15, 2007 || Kitt Peak || Spacewatch || — || align=right | 2.9 km || 
|-id=786 bgcolor=#d6d6d6
| 324786 ||  || — || April 15, 2007 || Catalina || CSS || 615 || align=right | 1.5 km || 
|-id=787 bgcolor=#d6d6d6
| 324787 Wlodarczyk ||  ||  || April 15, 2007 || Moletai || K. Černis || URS || align=right | 4.6 km || 
|-id=788 bgcolor=#d6d6d6
| 324788 ||  || — || April 15, 2007 || Kitt Peak || Spacewatch || VER || align=right | 4.3 km || 
|-id=789 bgcolor=#d6d6d6
| 324789 ||  || — || April 14, 2007 || Kitt Peak || Spacewatch || — || align=right | 2.8 km || 
|-id=790 bgcolor=#d6d6d6
| 324790 ||  || — || April 16, 2007 || Catalina || CSS || — || align=right | 4.9 km || 
|-id=791 bgcolor=#d6d6d6
| 324791 ||  || — || April 18, 2007 || Mount Lemmon || Mount Lemmon Survey || EOS || align=right | 2.1 km || 
|-id=792 bgcolor=#d6d6d6
| 324792 ||  || — || April 16, 2007 || Catalina || CSS || EMA || align=right | 3.8 km || 
|-id=793 bgcolor=#d6d6d6
| 324793 ||  || — || April 18, 2007 || Kitt Peak || Spacewatch || — || align=right | 3.4 km || 
|-id=794 bgcolor=#d6d6d6
| 324794 ||  || — || April 18, 2007 || Kitt Peak || Spacewatch || — || align=right | 4.1 km || 
|-id=795 bgcolor=#d6d6d6
| 324795 ||  || — || April 18, 2007 || Kitt Peak || Spacewatch || THM || align=right | 2.4 km || 
|-id=796 bgcolor=#d6d6d6
| 324796 ||  || — || April 18, 2007 || Kitt Peak || Spacewatch || — || align=right | 3.2 km || 
|-id=797 bgcolor=#d6d6d6
| 324797 ||  || — || April 18, 2007 || Kitt Peak || Spacewatch || EOS || align=right | 2.3 km || 
|-id=798 bgcolor=#d6d6d6
| 324798 ||  || — || April 18, 2007 || Kitt Peak || Spacewatch || — || align=right | 3.7 km || 
|-id=799 bgcolor=#d6d6d6
| 324799 ||  || — || April 19, 2007 || Anderson Mesa || LONEOS || — || align=right | 4.2 km || 
|-id=800 bgcolor=#d6d6d6
| 324800 ||  || — || April 18, 2007 || Mount Lemmon || Mount Lemmon Survey || — || align=right | 2.7 km || 
|}

324801–324900 

|-bgcolor=#d6d6d6
| 324801 ||  || — || April 18, 2007 || Kitt Peak || Spacewatch || — || align=right | 3.3 km || 
|-id=802 bgcolor=#d6d6d6
| 324802 ||  || — || April 18, 2007 || Mount Lemmon || Mount Lemmon Survey || — || align=right | 4.2 km || 
|-id=803 bgcolor=#d6d6d6
| 324803 ||  || — || April 20, 2007 || Mount Lemmon || Mount Lemmon Survey || VER || align=right | 2.9 km || 
|-id=804 bgcolor=#d6d6d6
| 324804 ||  || — || April 20, 2007 || Kitt Peak || Spacewatch || — || align=right | 4.4 km || 
|-id=805 bgcolor=#d6d6d6
| 324805 ||  || — || April 20, 2007 || Kitt Peak || Spacewatch || — || align=right | 3.2 km || 
|-id=806 bgcolor=#d6d6d6
| 324806 ||  || — || April 20, 2007 || Kitt Peak || Spacewatch || ALA || align=right | 4.3 km || 
|-id=807 bgcolor=#d6d6d6
| 324807 ||  || — || April 20, 2007 || Kitt Peak || Spacewatch || EOS || align=right | 2.6 km || 
|-id=808 bgcolor=#d6d6d6
| 324808 ||  || — || April 20, 2007 || Kitt Peak || Spacewatch || EUP || align=right | 6.2 km || 
|-id=809 bgcolor=#E9E9E9
| 324809 ||  || — || April 22, 2007 || Mount Lemmon || Mount Lemmon Survey || — || align=right | 2.9 km || 
|-id=810 bgcolor=#d6d6d6
| 324810 ||  || — || April 18, 2007 || Mount Lemmon || Mount Lemmon Survey || — || align=right | 2.6 km || 
|-id=811 bgcolor=#d6d6d6
| 324811 ||  || — || April 18, 2007 || Mount Lemmon || Mount Lemmon Survey || EOS || align=right | 2.3 km || 
|-id=812 bgcolor=#d6d6d6
| 324812 ||  || — || April 18, 2007 || Mount Lemmon || Mount Lemmon Survey || — || align=right | 3.7 km || 
|-id=813 bgcolor=#d6d6d6
| 324813 ||  || — || April 22, 2007 || Mount Lemmon || Mount Lemmon Survey || EOS || align=right | 2.8 km || 
|-id=814 bgcolor=#d6d6d6
| 324814 ||  || — || April 22, 2007 || Mount Lemmon || Mount Lemmon Survey || — || align=right | 6.5 km || 
|-id=815 bgcolor=#d6d6d6
| 324815 ||  || — || April 23, 2007 || Kitt Peak || Spacewatch || — || align=right | 3.6 km || 
|-id=816 bgcolor=#d6d6d6
| 324816 ||  || — || April 20, 2007 || Lulin || LUSS || — || align=right | 4.0 km || 
|-id=817 bgcolor=#d6d6d6
| 324817 ||  || — || April 22, 2007 || Kitt Peak || Spacewatch || — || align=right | 3.7 km || 
|-id=818 bgcolor=#d6d6d6
| 324818 ||  || — || April 25, 2007 || Mount Lemmon || Mount Lemmon Survey || — || align=right | 2.6 km || 
|-id=819 bgcolor=#d6d6d6
| 324819 ||  || — || April 25, 2007 || Mount Lemmon || Mount Lemmon Survey || — || align=right | 2.2 km || 
|-id=820 bgcolor=#d6d6d6
| 324820 ||  || — || April 25, 2007 || Mount Lemmon || Mount Lemmon Survey || ALA || align=right | 4.1 km || 
|-id=821 bgcolor=#d6d6d6
| 324821 ||  || — || April 25, 2007 || Mount Lemmon || Mount Lemmon Survey || — || align=right | 3.4 km || 
|-id=822 bgcolor=#d6d6d6
| 324822 ||  || — || April 22, 2007 || Kitt Peak || Spacewatch || — || align=right | 3.4 km || 
|-id=823 bgcolor=#d6d6d6
| 324823 ||  || — || April 24, 2007 || Kitt Peak || Spacewatch || — || align=right | 4.9 km || 
|-id=824 bgcolor=#d6d6d6
| 324824 ||  || — || April 24, 2007 || Kitt Peak || Spacewatch || — || align=right | 3.4 km || 
|-id=825 bgcolor=#d6d6d6
| 324825 ||  || — || April 16, 2007 || Mount Lemmon || Mount Lemmon Survey || — || align=right | 2.5 km || 
|-id=826 bgcolor=#d6d6d6
| 324826 ||  || — || April 20, 2007 || Mount Lemmon || Mount Lemmon Survey || KOR || align=right | 1.6 km || 
|-id=827 bgcolor=#d6d6d6
| 324827 ||  || — || April 18, 2007 || Kitt Peak || Spacewatch || — || align=right | 4.3 km || 
|-id=828 bgcolor=#d6d6d6
| 324828 ||  || — || April 18, 2007 || Kitt Peak || Spacewatch || — || align=right | 4.0 km || 
|-id=829 bgcolor=#d6d6d6
| 324829 ||  || — || March 25, 2007 || Mount Lemmon || Mount Lemmon Survey || JLI || align=right | 4.1 km || 
|-id=830 bgcolor=#d6d6d6
| 324830 ||  || — || April 22, 2007 || Mount Lemmon || Mount Lemmon Survey || — || align=right | 3.5 km || 
|-id=831 bgcolor=#d6d6d6
| 324831 ||  || — || May 7, 2007 || Catalina || CSS || — || align=right | 3.9 km || 
|-id=832 bgcolor=#d6d6d6
| 324832 ||  || — || January 5, 2006 || Catalina || CSS || — || align=right | 4.7 km || 
|-id=833 bgcolor=#d6d6d6
| 324833 ||  || — || May 6, 2007 || Kitt Peak || Spacewatch || EOS || align=right | 2.1 km || 
|-id=834 bgcolor=#d6d6d6
| 324834 ||  || — || May 9, 2007 || Catalina || CSS || THB || align=right | 3.4 km || 
|-id=835 bgcolor=#fefefe
| 324835 ||  || — || May 11, 2007 || Catalina || CSS || H || align=right data-sort-value="0.99" | 990 m || 
|-id=836 bgcolor=#d6d6d6
| 324836 ||  || — || May 7, 2007 || Kitt Peak || Spacewatch || — || align=right | 3.6 km || 
|-id=837 bgcolor=#d6d6d6
| 324837 ||  || — || May 7, 2007 || Kitt Peak || Spacewatch || — || align=right | 5.9 km || 
|-id=838 bgcolor=#d6d6d6
| 324838 ||  || — || May 7, 2007 || Kitt Peak || Spacewatch || — || align=right | 4.0 km || 
|-id=839 bgcolor=#d6d6d6
| 324839 ||  || — || May 9, 2007 || Catalina || CSS || VER || align=right | 4.0 km || 
|-id=840 bgcolor=#fefefe
| 324840 ||  || — || May 15, 2007 || Mount Lemmon || Mount Lemmon Survey || H || align=right data-sort-value="0.84" | 840 m || 
|-id=841 bgcolor=#d6d6d6
| 324841 ||  || — || May 10, 2007 || Anderson Mesa || LONEOS || EOS || align=right | 3.0 km || 
|-id=842 bgcolor=#d6d6d6
| 324842 ||  || — || May 12, 2007 || Purple Mountain || PMO NEO || EUP || align=right | 4.5 km || 
|-id=843 bgcolor=#d6d6d6
| 324843 ||  || — || May 16, 2007 || Kitt Peak || Spacewatch || — || align=right | 2.8 km || 
|-id=844 bgcolor=#d6d6d6
| 324844 ||  || — || May 23, 2007 || Mount Lemmon || Mount Lemmon Survey || ALA || align=right | 4.5 km || 
|-id=845 bgcolor=#d6d6d6
| 324845 ||  || — || May 23, 2007 || 7300 || W. K. Y. Yeung || — || align=right | 3.6 km || 
|-id=846 bgcolor=#d6d6d6
| 324846 ||  || — || May 24, 2007 || Mount Lemmon || Mount Lemmon Survey || — || align=right | 3.2 km || 
|-id=847 bgcolor=#d6d6d6
| 324847 ||  || — || June 7, 2007 || Kitt Peak || Spacewatch || — || align=right | 3.1 km || 
|-id=848 bgcolor=#d6d6d6
| 324848 ||  || — || May 13, 2007 || Kitt Peak || Spacewatch || — || align=right | 3.8 km || 
|-id=849 bgcolor=#d6d6d6
| 324849 ||  || — || June 8, 2007 || Kitt Peak || Spacewatch || EOS || align=right | 3.0 km || 
|-id=850 bgcolor=#d6d6d6
| 324850 ||  || — || June 8, 2007 || Kitt Peak || Spacewatch || — || align=right | 3.1 km || 
|-id=851 bgcolor=#d6d6d6
| 324851 ||  || — || June 8, 2007 || Kitt Peak || Spacewatch || — || align=right | 5.1 km || 
|-id=852 bgcolor=#d6d6d6
| 324852 ||  || — || April 25, 2007 || Kitt Peak || Spacewatch || — || align=right | 3.6 km || 
|-id=853 bgcolor=#d6d6d6
| 324853 ||  || — || June 9, 2007 || Kitt Peak || Spacewatch || — || align=right | 4.2 km || 
|-id=854 bgcolor=#d6d6d6
| 324854 ||  || — || June 12, 2007 || Kitt Peak || Spacewatch || — || align=right | 3.0 km || 
|-id=855 bgcolor=#d6d6d6
| 324855 ||  || — || June 15, 2007 || Kitt Peak || Spacewatch || — || align=right | 3.4 km || 
|-id=856 bgcolor=#d6d6d6
| 324856 ||  || — || June 6, 2007 || Catalina || CSS || Tj (2.96) || align=right | 3.4 km || 
|-id=857 bgcolor=#d6d6d6
| 324857 ||  || — || June 8, 2007 || Kitt Peak || Spacewatch || EMA || align=right | 3.2 km || 
|-id=858 bgcolor=#d6d6d6
| 324858 ||  || — || June 12, 2007 || Kitt Peak || Spacewatch || — || align=right | 4.8 km || 
|-id=859 bgcolor=#d6d6d6
| 324859 ||  || — || June 17, 2007 || Kitt Peak || Spacewatch || EOS || align=right | 2.3 km || 
|-id=860 bgcolor=#fefefe
| 324860 ||  || — || September 10, 2007 || Mount Lemmon || Mount Lemmon Survey || — || align=right data-sort-value="0.75" | 750 m || 
|-id=861 bgcolor=#fefefe
| 324861 ||  || — || September 10, 2007 || Mount Lemmon || Mount Lemmon Survey || PHO || align=right | 1.1 km || 
|-id=862 bgcolor=#fefefe
| 324862 ||  || — || September 14, 2007 || Mount Lemmon || Mount Lemmon Survey || FLO || align=right data-sort-value="0.58" | 580 m || 
|-id=863 bgcolor=#fefefe
| 324863 ||  || — || October 6, 2007 || Pla D'Arguines || R. Ferrando || FLO || align=right data-sort-value="0.70" | 700 m || 
|-id=864 bgcolor=#fefefe
| 324864 ||  || — || October 12, 2007 || 7300 || W. K. Y. Yeung || — || align=right data-sort-value="0.57" | 570 m || 
|-id=865 bgcolor=#fefefe
| 324865 ||  || — || October 9, 2007 || Mount Lemmon || Mount Lemmon Survey || — || align=right data-sort-value="0.54" | 540 m || 
|-id=866 bgcolor=#fefefe
| 324866 ||  || — || October 6, 2007 || Kitt Peak || Spacewatch || — || align=right data-sort-value="0.67" | 670 m || 
|-id=867 bgcolor=#fefefe
| 324867 ||  || — || October 15, 2007 || Dauban || Chante-Perdrix Obs. || FLO || align=right data-sort-value="0.72" | 720 m || 
|-id=868 bgcolor=#fefefe
| 324868 ||  || — || October 13, 2007 || Socorro || LINEAR || FLO || align=right data-sort-value="0.62" | 620 m || 
|-id=869 bgcolor=#fefefe
| 324869 ||  || — || October 7, 2007 || Kitt Peak || Spacewatch || — || align=right data-sort-value="0.98" | 980 m || 
|-id=870 bgcolor=#fefefe
| 324870 ||  || — || October 7, 2007 || Kitt Peak || Spacewatch || — || align=right data-sort-value="0.64" | 640 m || 
|-id=871 bgcolor=#fefefe
| 324871 ||  || — || October 8, 2007 || Kitt Peak || Spacewatch || — || align=right data-sort-value="0.87" | 870 m || 
|-id=872 bgcolor=#fefefe
| 324872 ||  || — || October 8, 2007 || Kitt Peak || Spacewatch || — || align=right data-sort-value="0.75" | 750 m || 
|-id=873 bgcolor=#fefefe
| 324873 ||  || — || October 9, 2007 || Kitt Peak || Spacewatch || — || align=right data-sort-value="0.82" | 820 m || 
|-id=874 bgcolor=#fefefe
| 324874 ||  || — || October 11, 2007 || Catalina || CSS || — || align=right data-sort-value="0.88" | 880 m || 
|-id=875 bgcolor=#fefefe
| 324875 ||  || — || October 9, 2007 || Mount Lemmon || Mount Lemmon Survey || — || align=right data-sort-value="0.81" | 810 m || 
|-id=876 bgcolor=#fefefe
| 324876 ||  || — || September 10, 2007 || Mount Lemmon || Mount Lemmon Survey || — || align=right data-sort-value="0.58" | 580 m || 
|-id=877 bgcolor=#fefefe
| 324877 ||  || — || October 14, 2007 || Mount Lemmon || Mount Lemmon Survey || FLO || align=right data-sort-value="0.62" | 620 m || 
|-id=878 bgcolor=#fefefe
| 324878 ||  || — || October 14, 2007 || Kitt Peak || Spacewatch || FLO || align=right data-sort-value="0.69" | 690 m || 
|-id=879 bgcolor=#fefefe
| 324879 ||  || — || October 14, 2007 || Kitt Peak || Spacewatch || FLO || align=right data-sort-value="0.55" | 550 m || 
|-id=880 bgcolor=#fefefe
| 324880 ||  || — || October 15, 2007 || Catalina || CSS || — || align=right data-sort-value="0.86" | 860 m || 
|-id=881 bgcolor=#fefefe
| 324881 ||  || — || October 15, 2007 || Kitt Peak || Spacewatch || FLO || align=right data-sort-value="0.59" | 590 m || 
|-id=882 bgcolor=#fefefe
| 324882 ||  || — || October 11, 2007 || Catalina || CSS || — || align=right data-sort-value="0.85" | 850 m || 
|-id=883 bgcolor=#fefefe
| 324883 ||  || — || October 16, 2007 || Kitt Peak || Spacewatch || — || align=right data-sort-value="0.91" | 910 m || 
|-id=884 bgcolor=#fefefe
| 324884 ||  || — || October 16, 2007 || Kitt Peak || Spacewatch || — || align=right data-sort-value="0.64" | 640 m || 
|-id=885 bgcolor=#fefefe
| 324885 ||  || — || October 19, 2007 || Kitt Peak || Spacewatch || — || align=right data-sort-value="0.80" | 800 m || 
|-id=886 bgcolor=#fefefe
| 324886 ||  || — || April 4, 2002 || Kitt Peak || Spacewatch || — || align=right data-sort-value="0.62" | 620 m || 
|-id=887 bgcolor=#E9E9E9
| 324887 ||  || — || October 31, 2007 || Catalina || CSS || — || align=right | 1.3 km || 
|-id=888 bgcolor=#fefefe
| 324888 ||  || — || October 30, 2007 || Catalina || CSS || — || align=right data-sort-value="0.99" | 990 m || 
|-id=889 bgcolor=#fefefe
| 324889 ||  || — || October 30, 2007 || Kitt Peak || Spacewatch || — || align=right data-sort-value="0.68" | 680 m || 
|-id=890 bgcolor=#fefefe
| 324890 ||  || — || October 19, 2007 || Mount Lemmon || Mount Lemmon Survey || V || align=right data-sort-value="0.69" | 690 m || 
|-id=891 bgcolor=#fefefe
| 324891 ||  || — || October 24, 2007 || Mount Lemmon || Mount Lemmon Survey || — || align=right data-sort-value="0.87" | 870 m || 
|-id=892 bgcolor=#fefefe
| 324892 ||  || — || November 1, 2007 || Kitt Peak || Spacewatch || — || align=right data-sort-value="0.75" | 750 m || 
|-id=893 bgcolor=#fefefe
| 324893 ||  || — || November 1, 2007 || Kitt Peak || Spacewatch || NYS || align=right data-sort-value="0.72" | 720 m || 
|-id=894 bgcolor=#fefefe
| 324894 ||  || — || November 1, 2007 || Kitt Peak || Spacewatch || — || align=right data-sort-value="0.79" | 790 m || 
|-id=895 bgcolor=#fefefe
| 324895 ||  || — || November 7, 2007 || La Sagra || OAM Obs. || FLO || align=right data-sort-value="0.77" | 770 m || 
|-id=896 bgcolor=#fefefe
| 324896 ||  || — || November 3, 2007 || Kitt Peak || Spacewatch || — || align=right data-sort-value="0.62" | 620 m || 
|-id=897 bgcolor=#fefefe
| 324897 ||  || — || November 3, 2007 || Kitt Peak || Spacewatch || — || align=right data-sort-value="0.61" | 610 m || 
|-id=898 bgcolor=#fefefe
| 324898 ||  || — || November 5, 2007 || Kitt Peak || Spacewatch || — || align=right data-sort-value="0.87" | 870 m || 
|-id=899 bgcolor=#fefefe
| 324899 ||  || — || November 11, 2007 || Bisei SG Center || BATTeRS || — || align=right | 1.0 km || 
|-id=900 bgcolor=#fefefe
| 324900 ||  || — || November 4, 2007 || Kitt Peak || Spacewatch || — || align=right data-sort-value="0.56" | 560 m || 
|}

324901–325000 

|-bgcolor=#fefefe
| 324901 ||  || — || November 4, 2007 || Kitt Peak || Spacewatch || — || align=right data-sort-value="0.77" | 770 m || 
|-id=902 bgcolor=#fefefe
| 324902 ||  || — || November 5, 2007 || Kitt Peak || Spacewatch || — || align=right data-sort-value="0.65" | 650 m || 
|-id=903 bgcolor=#fefefe
| 324903 ||  || — || November 8, 2007 || Mount Lemmon || Mount Lemmon Survey || — || align=right data-sort-value="0.87" | 870 m || 
|-id=904 bgcolor=#fefefe
| 324904 ||  || — || November 4, 2007 || Mount Lemmon || Mount Lemmon Survey || NYS || align=right data-sort-value="0.61" | 610 m || 
|-id=905 bgcolor=#fefefe
| 324905 ||  || — || November 9, 2007 || Catalina || CSS || — || align=right data-sort-value="0.77" | 770 m || 
|-id=906 bgcolor=#fefefe
| 324906 ||  || — || November 9, 2007 || Kitt Peak || Spacewatch || — || align=right data-sort-value="0.83" | 830 m || 
|-id=907 bgcolor=#fefefe
| 324907 ||  || — || November 9, 2007 || Kitt Peak || Spacewatch || — || align=right | 1.1 km || 
|-id=908 bgcolor=#fefefe
| 324908 ||  || — || November 7, 2007 || Kitt Peak || Spacewatch || — || align=right | 1.5 km || 
|-id=909 bgcolor=#fefefe
| 324909 ||  || — || November 11, 2007 || Mount Lemmon || Mount Lemmon Survey || — || align=right data-sort-value="0.63" | 630 m || 
|-id=910 bgcolor=#fefefe
| 324910 ||  || — || November 12, 2007 || Catalina || CSS || — || align=right data-sort-value="0.83" | 830 m || 
|-id=911 bgcolor=#fefefe
| 324911 ||  || — || November 15, 2007 || Socorro || LINEAR || PHO || align=right | 1.7 km || 
|-id=912 bgcolor=#fefefe
| 324912 ||  || — || November 14, 2007 || Bisei SG Center || BATTeRS || — || align=right data-sort-value="0.79" | 790 m || 
|-id=913 bgcolor=#fefefe
| 324913 ||  || — || November 13, 2007 || Mount Lemmon || Mount Lemmon Survey || — || align=right data-sort-value="0.81" | 810 m || 
|-id=914 bgcolor=#fefefe
| 324914 ||  || — || November 12, 2007 || Catalina || CSS || — || align=right data-sort-value="0.73" | 730 m || 
|-id=915 bgcolor=#fefefe
| 324915 ||  || — || November 2, 2007 || Kitt Peak || Spacewatch || — || align=right data-sort-value="0.85" | 850 m || 
|-id=916 bgcolor=#fefefe
| 324916 ||  || — || November 14, 2007 || Kitt Peak || Spacewatch || FLO || align=right data-sort-value="0.77" | 770 m || 
|-id=917 bgcolor=#fefefe
| 324917 ||  || — || November 15, 2007 || Catalina || CSS || — || align=right | 1.0 km || 
|-id=918 bgcolor=#fefefe
| 324918 ||  || — || November 8, 2007 || Kitt Peak || Spacewatch || — || align=right data-sort-value="0.93" | 930 m || 
|-id=919 bgcolor=#fefefe
| 324919 ||  || — || November 9, 2007 || Mount Lemmon || Mount Lemmon Survey || — || align=right data-sort-value="0.80" | 800 m || 
|-id=920 bgcolor=#fefefe
| 324920 ||  || — || November 3, 2007 || Kitt Peak || Spacewatch || — || align=right data-sort-value="0.64" | 640 m || 
|-id=921 bgcolor=#fefefe
| 324921 ||  || — || November 2, 2007 || Catalina || CSS || — || align=right data-sort-value="0.91" | 910 m || 
|-id=922 bgcolor=#fefefe
| 324922 ||  || — || November 4, 2007 || Kitt Peak || Spacewatch || — || align=right data-sort-value="0.72" | 720 m || 
|-id=923 bgcolor=#fefefe
| 324923 ||  || — || November 5, 2007 || Mount Lemmon || Mount Lemmon Survey || — || align=right data-sort-value="0.99" | 990 m || 
|-id=924 bgcolor=#fefefe
| 324924 ||  || — || November 11, 2007 || Mount Lemmon || Mount Lemmon Survey || NYS || align=right data-sort-value="0.76" | 760 m || 
|-id=925 bgcolor=#fefefe
| 324925 Vivantdenon ||  ||  || November 17, 2007 || Saint-Sulpice || B. Christophe || — || align=right data-sort-value="0.80" | 800 m || 
|-id=926 bgcolor=#fefefe
| 324926 ||  || — || November 17, 2007 || Socorro || LINEAR || — || align=right | 1.2 km || 
|-id=927 bgcolor=#fefefe
| 324927 ||  || — || November 18, 2007 || Socorro || LINEAR || — || align=right data-sort-value="0.86" | 860 m || 
|-id=928 bgcolor=#fefefe
| 324928 ||  || — || November 2, 2007 || Mount Lemmon || Mount Lemmon Survey || — || align=right data-sort-value="0.72" | 720 m || 
|-id=929 bgcolor=#fefefe
| 324929 ||  || — || November 18, 2007 || Mount Lemmon || Mount Lemmon Survey || V || align=right data-sort-value="0.76" | 760 m || 
|-id=930 bgcolor=#fefefe
| 324930 ||  || — || October 24, 2007 || Mount Lemmon || Mount Lemmon Survey || — || align=right data-sort-value="0.75" | 750 m || 
|-id=931 bgcolor=#fefefe
| 324931 ||  || — || November 30, 2007 || Lulin || LUSS || — || align=right | 1.0 km || 
|-id=932 bgcolor=#fefefe
| 324932 ||  || — || December 2, 2007 || Lulin || LUSS || NYS || align=right data-sort-value="0.66" | 660 m || 
|-id=933 bgcolor=#fefefe
| 324933 ||  || — || December 8, 2007 || Bisei SG Center || BATTeRS || FLO || align=right data-sort-value="0.77" | 770 m || 
|-id=934 bgcolor=#fefefe
| 324934 ||  || — || December 12, 2007 || La Sagra || OAM Obs. || — || align=right data-sort-value="0.79" | 790 m || 
|-id=935 bgcolor=#fefefe
| 324935 ||  || — || December 13, 2007 || Pla D'Arguines || R. Ferrando || — || align=right data-sort-value="0.85" | 850 m || 
|-id=936 bgcolor=#fefefe
| 324936 ||  || — || December 9, 2007 || Bisei SG Center || BATTeRS || NYS || align=right data-sort-value="0.67" | 670 m || 
|-id=937 bgcolor=#fefefe
| 324937 ||  || — || December 13, 2007 || Socorro || LINEAR || V || align=right data-sort-value="0.67" | 670 m || 
|-id=938 bgcolor=#fefefe
| 324938 ||  || — || December 6, 2007 || Kitt Peak || Spacewatch || — || align=right | 1.1 km || 
|-id=939 bgcolor=#fefefe
| 324939 ||  || — || December 13, 2007 || Socorro || LINEAR || V || align=right data-sort-value="0.84" | 840 m || 
|-id=940 bgcolor=#fefefe
| 324940 ||  || — || December 15, 2007 || Catalina || CSS || — || align=right | 1.0 km || 
|-id=941 bgcolor=#fefefe
| 324941 ||  || — || December 15, 2007 || Kitt Peak || Spacewatch || FLO || align=right data-sort-value="0.64" | 640 m || 
|-id=942 bgcolor=#fefefe
| 324942 ||  || — || December 5, 2007 || Mount Lemmon || Mount Lemmon Survey || NYS || align=right data-sort-value="0.77" | 770 m || 
|-id=943 bgcolor=#fefefe
| 324943 ||  || — || December 3, 2007 || Kitt Peak || Spacewatch || NYS || align=right data-sort-value="0.86" | 860 m || 
|-id=944 bgcolor=#fefefe
| 324944 ||  || — || December 10, 2007 || Socorro || LINEAR || — || align=right data-sort-value="0.98" | 980 m || 
|-id=945 bgcolor=#fefefe
| 324945 ||  || — || March 12, 2002 || Palomar || NEAT || — || align=right data-sort-value="0.69" | 690 m || 
|-id=946 bgcolor=#fefefe
| 324946 ||  || — || December 16, 2007 || Mount Lemmon || Mount Lemmon Survey || — || align=right data-sort-value="0.78" | 780 m || 
|-id=947 bgcolor=#fefefe
| 324947 ||  || — || December 17, 2007 || Mount Lemmon || Mount Lemmon Survey || — || align=right | 1.1 km || 
|-id=948 bgcolor=#fefefe
| 324948 ||  || — || December 18, 2007 || Mount Lemmon || Mount Lemmon Survey || — || align=right | 1.0 km || 
|-id=949 bgcolor=#fefefe
| 324949 ||  || — || December 19, 2007 || Kitt Peak || Spacewatch || — || align=right data-sort-value="0.83" | 830 m || 
|-id=950 bgcolor=#fefefe
| 324950 ||  || — || December 28, 2007 || Kitt Peak || Spacewatch || MAS || align=right data-sort-value="0.74" | 740 m || 
|-id=951 bgcolor=#fefefe
| 324951 ||  || — || December 28, 2007 || Kitt Peak || Spacewatch || MAS || align=right data-sort-value="0.65" | 650 m || 
|-id=952 bgcolor=#fefefe
| 324952 ||  || — || December 30, 2007 || Kitt Peak || Spacewatch || FLO || align=right data-sort-value="0.93" | 930 m || 
|-id=953 bgcolor=#fefefe
| 324953 ||  || — || December 30, 2007 || Mount Lemmon || Mount Lemmon Survey || — || align=right data-sort-value="0.93" | 930 m || 
|-id=954 bgcolor=#fefefe
| 324954 ||  || — || December 30, 2007 || Mount Lemmon || Mount Lemmon Survey || ERI || align=right | 1.9 km || 
|-id=955 bgcolor=#fefefe
| 324955 ||  || — || December 31, 2007 || Mount Lemmon || Mount Lemmon Survey || V || align=right data-sort-value="0.72" | 720 m || 
|-id=956 bgcolor=#fefefe
| 324956 ||  || — || December 31, 2007 || Catalina || CSS || — || align=right | 1.4 km || 
|-id=957 bgcolor=#fefefe
| 324957 ||  || — || December 28, 2007 || Kitt Peak || Spacewatch || — || align=right | 1.0 km || 
|-id=958 bgcolor=#fefefe
| 324958 ||  || — || December 30, 2007 || Mount Lemmon || Mount Lemmon Survey || MAS || align=right data-sort-value="0.63" | 630 m || 
|-id=959 bgcolor=#fefefe
| 324959 ||  || — || December 30, 2007 || Kitt Peak || Spacewatch || — || align=right data-sort-value="0.65" | 650 m || 
|-id=960 bgcolor=#fefefe
| 324960 ||  || — || December 19, 2007 || Mount Lemmon || Mount Lemmon Survey || — || align=right data-sort-value="0.76" | 760 m || 
|-id=961 bgcolor=#fefefe
| 324961 ||  || — || December 19, 2007 || Mount Lemmon || Mount Lemmon Survey || V || align=right data-sort-value="0.85" | 850 m || 
|-id=962 bgcolor=#fefefe
| 324962 ||  || — || December 30, 2007 || Catalina || CSS || NYS || align=right data-sort-value="0.72" | 720 m || 
|-id=963 bgcolor=#fefefe
| 324963 ||  || — || December 31, 2007 || Kitt Peak || Spacewatch || NYS || align=right data-sort-value="0.73" | 730 m || 
|-id=964 bgcolor=#fefefe
| 324964 ||  || — || December 4, 2007 || Kitt Peak || Spacewatch || — || align=right | 1.1 km || 
|-id=965 bgcolor=#fefefe
| 324965 ||  || — || January 4, 2008 || Purple Mountain || PMO NEO || — || align=right data-sort-value="0.95" | 950 m || 
|-id=966 bgcolor=#fefefe
| 324966 ||  || — || January 10, 2008 || Kitt Peak || Spacewatch || EUT || align=right data-sort-value="0.65" | 650 m || 
|-id=967 bgcolor=#fefefe
| 324967 ||  || — || January 10, 2008 || Kitt Peak || Spacewatch || NYS || align=right data-sort-value="0.64" | 640 m || 
|-id=968 bgcolor=#fefefe
| 324968 ||  || — || January 10, 2008 || Catalina || CSS || NYS || align=right data-sort-value="0.69" | 690 m || 
|-id=969 bgcolor=#fefefe
| 324969 ||  || — || January 10, 2008 || Mount Lemmon || Mount Lemmon Survey || NYS || align=right data-sort-value="0.70" | 700 m || 
|-id=970 bgcolor=#fefefe
| 324970 ||  || — || January 10, 2008 || Catalina || CSS || — || align=right | 1.1 km || 
|-id=971 bgcolor=#fefefe
| 324971 ||  || — || January 11, 2008 || Desert Eagle || W. K. Y. Yeung || — || align=right data-sort-value="0.77" | 770 m || 
|-id=972 bgcolor=#fefefe
| 324972 ||  || — || January 7, 2008 || La Sagra || OAM Obs. || NYS || align=right data-sort-value="0.88" | 880 m || 
|-id=973 bgcolor=#fefefe
| 324973 ||  || — || January 10, 2008 || Kitt Peak || Spacewatch || V || align=right data-sort-value="0.75" | 750 m || 
|-id=974 bgcolor=#fefefe
| 324974 ||  || — || January 10, 2008 || Kitt Peak || Spacewatch || NYS || align=right data-sort-value="0.79" | 790 m || 
|-id=975 bgcolor=#fefefe
| 324975 ||  || — || January 11, 2008 || Kitt Peak || Spacewatch || — || align=right data-sort-value="0.87" | 870 m || 
|-id=976 bgcolor=#fefefe
| 324976 ||  || — || January 11, 2008 || Kitt Peak || Spacewatch || — || align=right data-sort-value="0.93" | 930 m || 
|-id=977 bgcolor=#fefefe
| 324977 ||  || — || January 11, 2008 || Kitt Peak || Spacewatch || NYS || align=right data-sort-value="0.64" | 640 m || 
|-id=978 bgcolor=#fefefe
| 324978 ||  || — || January 11, 2008 || Mount Lemmon || Mount Lemmon Survey || NYS || align=right data-sort-value="0.63" | 630 m || 
|-id=979 bgcolor=#fefefe
| 324979 ||  || — || January 12, 2008 || Kitt Peak || Spacewatch || — || align=right | 1.1 km || 
|-id=980 bgcolor=#fefefe
| 324980 ||  || — || January 11, 2008 || Mount Lemmon || Mount Lemmon Survey || CLA || align=right | 1.4 km || 
|-id=981 bgcolor=#fefefe
| 324981 ||  || — || January 13, 2008 || Kitt Peak || Spacewatch || MAS || align=right data-sort-value="0.67" | 670 m || 
|-id=982 bgcolor=#fefefe
| 324982 ||  || — || January 14, 2008 || Kitt Peak || Spacewatch || — || align=right data-sort-value="0.91" | 910 m || 
|-id=983 bgcolor=#fefefe
| 324983 ||  || — || January 14, 2008 || Kitt Peak || Spacewatch || FLO || align=right data-sort-value="0.92" | 920 m || 
|-id=984 bgcolor=#fefefe
| 324984 ||  || — || January 15, 2008 || Kitt Peak || Spacewatch || — || align=right data-sort-value="0.89" | 890 m || 
|-id=985 bgcolor=#fefefe
| 324985 ||  || — || January 10, 2008 || Kitt Peak || Spacewatch || V || align=right data-sort-value="0.80" | 800 m || 
|-id=986 bgcolor=#fefefe
| 324986 ||  || — || January 13, 2008 || Mount Lemmon || Mount Lemmon Survey || — || align=right | 1.1 km || 
|-id=987 bgcolor=#fefefe
| 324987 ||  || — || January 15, 2008 || Mount Lemmon || Mount Lemmon Survey || — || align=right data-sort-value="0.90" | 900 m || 
|-id=988 bgcolor=#fefefe
| 324988 ||  || — || January 16, 2008 || Kitt Peak || Spacewatch || — || align=right data-sort-value="0.79" | 790 m || 
|-id=989 bgcolor=#fefefe
| 324989 ||  || — || January 16, 2008 || Kitt Peak || Spacewatch || — || align=right data-sort-value="0.66" | 660 m || 
|-id=990 bgcolor=#fefefe
| 324990 ||  || — || January 16, 2008 || Kitt Peak || Spacewatch || CLA || align=right | 2.0 km || 
|-id=991 bgcolor=#fefefe
| 324991 ||  || — || January 16, 2008 || Kitt Peak || Spacewatch || — || align=right data-sort-value="0.99" | 990 m || 
|-id=992 bgcolor=#E9E9E9
| 324992 ||  || — || October 10, 2007 || Mount Lemmon || Mount Lemmon Survey || — || align=right | 1.8 km || 
|-id=993 bgcolor=#fefefe
| 324993 ||  || — || January 19, 2008 || Mount Lemmon || Mount Lemmon Survey || NYS || align=right data-sort-value="0.63" | 630 m || 
|-id=994 bgcolor=#fefefe
| 324994 ||  || — || January 28, 2008 || Altschwendt || W. Ries || V || align=right data-sort-value="0.57" | 570 m || 
|-id=995 bgcolor=#fefefe
| 324995 ||  || — || November 8, 2007 || Mount Lemmon || Mount Lemmon Survey || NYS || align=right data-sort-value="0.55" | 550 m || 
|-id=996 bgcolor=#fefefe
| 324996 ||  || — || January 28, 2008 || Lulin || LUSS || — || align=right data-sort-value="0.86" | 860 m || 
|-id=997 bgcolor=#fefefe
| 324997 ||  || — || January 30, 2008 || Mount Lemmon || Mount Lemmon Survey || NYS || align=right data-sort-value="0.85" | 850 m || 
|-id=998 bgcolor=#fefefe
| 324998 ||  || — || January 30, 2008 || Kitt Peak || Spacewatch || MAS || align=right data-sort-value="0.68" | 680 m || 
|-id=999 bgcolor=#fefefe
| 324999 ||  || — || January 30, 2008 || Catalina || CSS || — || align=right data-sort-value="0.79" | 790 m || 
|-id=000 bgcolor=#fefefe
| 325000 ||  || — || January 30, 2008 || Mount Lemmon || Mount Lemmon Survey || NYS || align=right data-sort-value="0.64" | 640 m || 
|}

References

External links 
 Discovery Circumstances: Numbered Minor Planets (320001)–(325000) (IAU Minor Planet Center)

0324